= Gym Class Heroes discography =

American discography

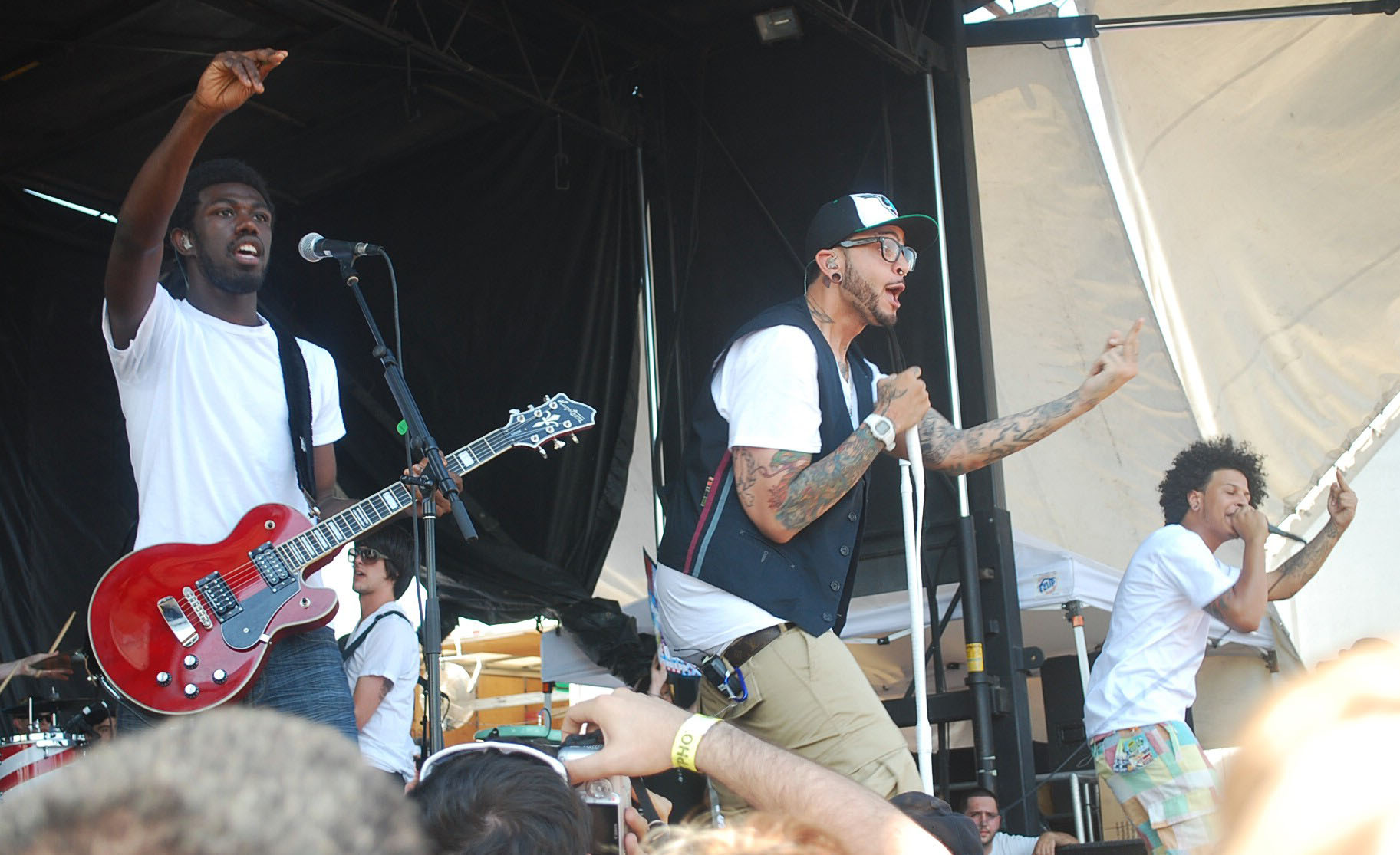
- Studio albums: 5
- Extended plays: 2
- Singles: 12

This is the complete discography of rap rock band Gym Class Heroes. The group released their debut album independently before they were signed to Decaydance Records, an imprint of Fueled by Ramen on which they released the album The Papercut Chronicles in 2005. The group gained a strong fan base while promoting the album, appearing at festivals such as The Bamboozle and Warped Tour. In 2006, the group released the gold-selling album As Cruel as School Children. Their single "Cupid's Chokehold" reached No. 4 on the Billboard Hot 100, and "Clothes Off!!" peaked at No. 5 in the United Kingdom. In 2008, Gym Class Heroes released their third album, The Quilt, which contained numerous collaborations with other artists.

The band went on hiatus in 2009, a time in which the members pursued various side projects. Lead vocalist Travie McCoy released his solo debut album Lazarus in 2010. Guitarist Disashi Lumumba-Kasongo has been working on his side-project Soul, while drummer Matt McGinley now drums in the rock group Kill the Frontman. The group released The Papercut Chronicles II in 2011, and the single "Stereo Hearts" peaked at No. 4 on the Billboard Hot 100.

== Albums ==
=== Studio albums ===
List of albums, with selected chart positions
| Title | Album details | Peak chart positions | | | | | | Certifications |
| Title | Album details | US | US Rap | AUS | FRA | NL | UK | Certifications |
|---|---|---|---|---|---|---|---|---|
| ...For the Kids | Released: December 23, 2001; Label: Self-released | — | — | — | — | — | — | |
| The Papercut Chronicles | Released: February 22, 2005; Label: Fueled by Ramen | — | — | — | — | — | — | |
| As Cruel as School Children | Released: July 25, 2006; Label: Fueled by Ramen | 35 | 8 | 40 | 191 | 68 | 19 | RIAA: Gold; BPI: Gold; RMNZ: Gold |
| The Quilt | Released: September 9, 2008; Label: Fueled by Ramen | 14 | 5 | — | — | — | 41 | |
| The Papercut Chronicles II | Release date: November 15, 2011; Label: Fueled by Ramen | 54 | 10 | — | — | — | 95 | RMNZ: Platinum |
"—" denotes releases that did not chart.

=== Demo albums ===
List of demo albums
| Title | Album details |
|---|---|
| Hed Candy | Released: 1999; Label: Independent release |
| Greasy Kid Stuff | Released: 2000; Label: Independent release |

== EPs ==
List of EPs
| Title | EP details |
|---|---|
| The Papercut EP | Released: October 29, 2004; Label: Fueled by Ramen |
| Patches from the Quilt | Released: July 8, 2008; Label: Fueled by Ramen |

== Singles ==
List of singles, with selected chart positions, certifications and album name
| Title | Year | Peak chart positions | | | | | | | | | | Certifications | Album |
| Title | Year | US | US Pop | AUS | AUT | CAN | FIN | IRE | NL | NZ | UK | Certifications | Album |
|---|---|---|---|---|---|---|---|---|---|---|---|---|---|
| "Taxi Driver" | 2004 | — | — | — | — | — | — | — | — | — | — | | The Papercut Chronicles |
| "Papercuts" | 2005 | — | — | — | — | — | — | — | — | — | — | | The Papercut Chronicles |
| "The Queen and I" | 2006 | — | 40 | — | — | — | — | — | — | — | 124 | | As Cruel as School Children |
| "New Friend Request" | 2006 | — | — | — | — | — | — | — | — | — | — | | As Cruel as School Children |
| "Cupid's Chokehold" (featuring Patrick Stump) | 2006 | 4 | 1 | 14 | 42 | 3 | 9 | 3 | 8 | 6 | 3 | RIAA: 5× Platinum; BPI: Platinum; MC: 3× Platinum; RMNZ: 2× Platinum | As Cruel as School Children |
| "Clothes Off" (featuring Patrick Stump) | 2007 | 46 | 20 | 11 | 58 | — | 4 | 7 | 75 | 13 | 5 | BPI: Silver | As Cruel as School Children |
| "Peace Sign/Index Down" (featuring Busta Rhymes) | 2008 | — | — | — | — | — | — | — | — | — | — | | The Quilt |
| "Cookie Jar" (featuring The-Dream) | 2008 | 59 | — | 41 | — | 91 | — | 24 | 85 | — | 6 | BPI: Silver | The Quilt |
| "Guilty as Charged" (featuring Estelle) | 2008 | — | — | — | — | — | — | — | — | — | — | | The Quilt |
| "Stereo Hearts" (featuring Adam Levine) | 2011 | 4 | 1 | 4 | 28 | 7 | 16 | 4 | 8 | 3 | 3 | RIAA: 5× Platinum; ARIA: 3× Platinum; BPI: 2× Platinum; MC: 3× Platinum; RMNZ: 5× Platinum | The Papercut Chronicles II |
| "Ass Back Home" (featuring Neon Hitch) | 2011 | 12 | 5 | 1 | — | 24 | — | 10 | 81 | 11 | 9 | RIAA: Platinum; ARIA: 3× Platinum; BPI: Silver; MC: Gold; RMNZ: 2× Platinum | The Papercut Chronicles II |
| "The Fighter" (featuring Ryan Tedder) | 2011 | 25 | 13 | 7 | — | 35 | — | 15 | — | 4 | 44 | RIAA: Platinum; ARIA: Platinum; RMNZ: Gold | The Papercut Chronicles II |
"—" denotes a recording that did not chart or was not released in that territory.

=== Promotional singles ===
| Title | Year | Album |
|---|---|---|
| "Life Goes On" (featuring Oh Land) | 2011 | The Papercut Chronicles II |

== Other contributions ==
| Song | Year | Album |
|---|---|---|
| "New Friend Request" (Hi-Tek Remix) | 2006 | Snakes on a Plane: The Album |
| "Under the Bridge" | 2006 | Punk Goes 90's |
| "Shell Shock" | 2007 | TMNT soundtrack |

== Music videos ==
| Title | Year | Director(s) |
|---|---|---|
| "Taxi Driver" | 2004 | |
| "Papercuts" | 2005 | Alan Ferguson |
| "The Queen and I" | 2006 | |
| "New Friend Request" | 2006 | Andrew Bowser & Joseph M. Petrick |
| "Cupid's Chokehold" | 2006 | Alan Ferguson |
| "Shoot Down the Stars" | 2007 | Alan Ferguson |
| "Clothes Off" | 2007 | Alan Ferguson |
| "Peace Sign / Index Down" | 2008 | Dale Resteghini |
| "Cookie Jar" | 2008 | Dale Resteghini |
| "Guilty as Charged" | 2008 | Mark Allan Staubach |
| "Stereo Hearts" | 2011 | Hiro Murai |
| "Ass Back Home" | 2011 | Dugan O'Neal |
| "The Fighter" | 2012 | Marc Klasfeld & Nico Sabenorio |
| "Solo Discotheque (The Disashi Chronicles)" | 2012 | Tom Harmon |
| "Life Goes On (The Matt Chronicles)"" | 2012 | Tom Harmon |
| "Nil-Nil-Draw (The Eric Chronicles)"" | 2012 | Tom Harmon |
| "Holy Horses**t, Batman! (The Travie Chronicles)"" | 2012 | Tom Harmon |
| "Martyrial Girls" | 2012 | Vashtie Kola |
