= Ammar Malik =

American songwriter

- Born: June 22, 1987 (age 38)
- Origin: Northern Virginia, U.S.
- Genres: Pop, pop rock, alternative hip hop, reggae
- Occupations: Songwriter, musician

Ammar Malik (born June 22, 1987) is an American songwriter. He has co-written several modern pop songs, most notably Maroon 5's "Moves like Jagger" and Gym Class Heroes' "Stereo Hearts" which have both been certified multi-platinum by the RIAA. He tied for 17th place in Songtrust's publication of the top 20 songwriters of 2011. Ammar Malik's songs have sold over 100 million copies worldwide in total.

== Early life and education ==
Malik was born in Northern Virginia, on June 22, 1987, to first-generation American born to Pakistani parents. He first started learning guitar when he was 14. As a high school and college student he wrote and performed music locally with several different bands.

Malik attended George Mason University in Fairfax, Virginia, where he majored in English.

== Songwriting ==
Malik's close friend and co-manager David Silberstein had a childhood connection to producer Benny Blanco along with his brother and now co-manager Jeremy Levin. After Malik and Blanco were introduced, Blanco suggested he try his hand at writing songs for other artists. Though Malik had intentions of being an artist himself, when nearing the end of college he decided to give it a shot. In an interview Malik said that two of his biggest influences are Radiohead and Rx Bandits. He also co-wrote "Compass" by Lady Antebellum in 2013's single.

In 2013, Malik won the coveted BMI Pop Songwriter of the Year title, along with Benny Blanco, and Claude Kelly. Each contributed four songs to the year's most performed list. Malik co-penned "Ass Back Home", "Moves Like Jagger, "Payphone" and "Stereo Hearts". Benny Blanco, Adam Levine and Ammar Malik also clinched BMI Pop Song of the Year honors for their co-write of "Moves Like Jagger".

=== Songwriting discography ===
Year	Artist(s)	Song	Album
2011	Maroon 5 ft. Christina Aguilera	"Moves like Jagger"	Hands All Over
2011	Gym Class Heroes ft. Adam Levine	"Stereo Hearts"	The Papercut Chronicles II
2011	Gym Class Heroes ft. Neon Hitch	"Ass Back Home"	The Papercut Chronicles II
2011	Taio Cruz	"Make It Last Forever"	TY.O
2012	Sean Paul	"Put It on You"	Tomahawk Technique
2012	Maroon 5	"Payphone"	Overexposed
2012	Maroon 5	"Beautiful Goodbye"	Overexposed
2012	B.o.B ft. Taylor Swift	"Both of Us"	Strange Clouds
2012	Adam Lambert	"Naked Love"	Trespassing
2012	Rome	"Seasons"	Dedication EP
2012	Rome	"Oz of Love"	Dedication EP
2012	Marina and the Diamonds	"How to be a Heartbreaker"	Electra Heart
2012	Cher Lloyd feat. Becky G	"Oath"	Sticks + Stones
2012	Kesha	"Thinking of You"	Warrior
2012	Kesha	"Last Goodbye"	Warrior
2013	Wallpaper.	"Drunken Hearts"	Ricky Reed is Real
2013	Keith Urban	"Shame"	Fuse
2013	Travie McCoy	"Rough Water"	Rough Water
2013	Twin Forks	"Cross My Mind"	Twin Forks
2013	Jessie J	"Excuse My Rude"	Alive
2013	Jessie J	"Harder We Fall"	Alive
2013	Lady Antebellum	"Compass"	Golden
2013	Gavin Degraw	"Make A Move"	Make a Move
2013	Rixton	"Make Out"	TBA
2013	James Blunt	"Always Hate Me"	Moon Landing
2013	Mikky Ekko	"Place for Us"	The Hunger Games: Catching Fire – Original Motion Picture Soundtrack
2014	Rixton	"Me and My Broken Heart"	Me and My Broken Heart EP
2014	Pitbull ft. G. R. L	"Wild Wild Love"	Globalization
2014	Maroon 5	"Maps"	V
2014	Maroon 5	"Leaving California"	V
2014	Maroon 5	"Shoot Love"	V
2014	Jason Mraz	"Quiet"	Yes!
2014	Nick Jonas	"Chains"	Nick Jonas
2014	Nick Jonas	"Teacher"	Nick Jonas
2014	Ariana Grande	"Why Try"	My Everything
2014	James Blunt	"When I Find Love Again"	Moon Landing (Apollo Edition)
2014	James Blunt	"Trail of Broken Hearts"	Moon Landing (Apollo Edition)
2015	Olly Murs	"Seasons"	Never Been Better
2015	Rixton	"Whole"	Let the Road
2015	Rixton	"We All Want the Same Thing"	Let the Road
2015	Rixton	"I Like Girls"	Let the Road
2015	Prince Royce	"Double Vision"	Double Vision
2015	Max Frost	"Withdrawal"	Withdrawal
2015	BØRNS	"The Fool"	Dopamine
2015	Matt McAndrew	"Counting On Love"	Counting On Love
2015	Cashmere Cat	"Adore (feat. Ariana Grande)"	Adore
2015	JoJo	"When Love Hurts"	III
2015	One Direction	"I Want to Write You a Song"	Made In The A.M.
2015	The Vamps	"Wake Up"	Wake Up
2015	The Vamps	"Be with You"	Wake Up
2015	The Vamps	"I Found a Girl"	Wake Up
2015	The Vamps	"Windmills"	Wake Up
2015	The Vamps	"Volcano"	Wake Up
2016	DJ Snake	"Sober (feat. JRY)"	Encore
2016	Birdy	"Lifted"	Beautiful Lies
2016	Olivia Holt	"Phoenix"	Olivia
2016	Reggie 'n' Bollie	"New Girl"	New Girl - Single
2016	Matoma	"Wonderful Life (Mi Oh My)"	The Angry Birds Movie (Original Motion Picture Soundtrack)
2016	5 Seconds of Summer	"Girls Talk Boys"	Ghostbusters (Original Motion Picture Soundtrack)
2016	Martina Stoessel	"Don't Cry for Me"	Tini
2016	Maroon 5	"Don't Wanna Know (feat. Kendrick Lamar)"	Don't Wanna Know - Single
2016	Clean Bandit	"Rockabye (feat. Sean Paul & Anne-Marie)"	What Is Love?
2016	OneRepublic	"Born"	Oh My My
2016	Robin Schultz, David Guetta & Cheat Codes	"Shed A Light"	Shed A Light - Single
2017	Ed Sheeran	"New Man"	÷
2017	Clean Bandit	"Symphony (feat. Zara Larsson)"	What Is Love?
2017	Zara Larsson	"Sundown"	So Good
2017	Jessie Ware	"Selfish Love"	TBA
2017	Maroon 5	"Wait", "Who I Am" (featuring LunchMoney Lewis), "Closure"	Red Pill Blues
2018	Lost Frequencies	"Melody (feat. James Blunt)"	Melody - Single
2018	Galantis	"Spaceship (feat. Uffie)"	Spaceship - Single
2019	Weezer	"I'm Just Being Honest"	Weezer (Black Album)
2019	Thomas Rhett	"Look What God Gave Her"	Center Point Road
2019	Fitz and the Tantrums	"I Need Help!"	All the Feels
2019	Deorro	"Obvious"	Obvious - Single
2019	Jonas Brothers	"Trust"	Happiness Begins
2019	Why Don't We	"What Am I"	What Am I - Single
2020	Halsey	"More"	Manic
2020	Selena Gomez	"Feel Me"	Rare
2020	Lauv	"Tattoos Together"	How I'm Feeling
2020	HOKO	"Hellogoodbye"	Hellogoodbye - Single
2020	Biffy Clyro	"Instant History"	A Celebration of Endings

== Personal life ==
Malik married Chyna Bardarson on June 19, 2022 in Malibu, California.
