= Don't Pretend =

Don't Pretend may refer to:

- "Don't Pretend", a 2019 song by Khalid from Free Spirit
- "Don't Pretend", a 2010 song by Travie McCoy from Lazarus
