= Lazarus (Travie McCoy album) =

Studio album by Travie McCoy
- Released: June 8, 2010
- Recorded: 2008–2010
- Genres: Pop; hip-hop; reggae; rock
- Length: 35:13
- Labels: Nappy Boy; Decaydance; Fueled by Ramen
- Producers: Chad Beatz; DJ Frank E; Andrew "Drew" Correa; Hannon Lane; Infamous; Josh Abraham; Lucas Secon; Oligee; the Smeezingtons; the Stereotypes; Tommy Hittz; Wes Borland

Travie McCoy chronology
Lazarus (2010)	Never Slept Better (2022)

Singles from Lazarus
- 1. "Billionaire" Released: March 9, 2010; 2. "Need You" Released: September 14, 2010; 3. "We'll Be Alright" Released: October 18, 2010

Lazarus is the debut studio album by American rapper Travie McCoy released on June 8, 2010. McCoy announced his plans to pursue a solo career in early 2010, although he insisted that Gym Class Heroes had not broken up. After creating demos of melancholy and low-tempo songs, McCoy decided to abandon his early material and start over, as he claimed the songs were "too personal." He began to write more uptempo "party anthems" with lyrical themes of overcoming grief. He drew from various musical influences on the record, including hip hop, reggae, and rock.

Upon its release, Lazarus debuted at No. 25 on the Billboard 200 chart, and the lead single "Billionaire" peaked at No. 4 on the Billboard Hot 100. The songs "Need You" and "We'll Be Alright" were also released as singles. The album received generally positive reviews, with critics praising its upbeat songs while criticizing the overabundance of featured collaborations. In 2019, the album was certified gold by the Recording Industry Association of America (RIAA) for sales of over 500,000 copies.

== Background ==
In early 2010, Gym Class Heroes lead vocalist Travie McCoy announced that he would be pursuing a solo career. He denied rumors that Gym Class Heroes had broken up, asserting that "Since the inception of Gym Class in 1997, every member has had another musical outlet, if not three or four. This is just another one of those." McCoy began writing new material while Gym Class was on the road promoting The Quilt (2008). He had originally prepared to record an introspective album of "sad and somber" acoustic songs reflective of his state of mind following his breakup with singer Katy Perry and his addiction to painkillers. However, he decided to scrap his early material and start over, calling it "too personal." He added, "I didn't want that to be my first look as a solo artist," comparing the album to Kanye West's 808s & Heartbreak (2008).

McCoy temporarily relocated to Miami, Florida to record new material and recover from his addiction, which helped him to create a more upbeat album because he "want[ed] to do something positive." McCoy decided to officially call himself "Travie" on the album instead of Travis, explaining that he has been called Travie by friends and family for "as long as [he] can remember." He believes that the new name allows listeners to become "that much closer" to him and to "feel much more comfortable with calling [him] Travie and being part of the family."

== Recording and production ==
It was a year in the making. We thought we had found the lane, then I started doing other shit. Now that it's done and I've listened to it a bunch of times, I'll say that it's got a pop appeal...the songs will appeal to a broader range of people as opposed to the hip-hop crowd or conventional [Gym Class Heroes] crowd.

— Travie McCoy (2011)

Lazarus was released after being in the works for a year and a half. McCoy calls the album "The longest, I think, I've spent on a record in my whole career." He wanted to keep the number of collaborations on the album "kinda tight," but he plans to work with other artists on remixes of the album. Producers on the album include Bruno Mars, T-Pain, The Smeezingtons, The Stereotypes, Lucas Secon, Oligee and Josh Abraham; Bruno Mars, T-Pain and Cee Lo Green provide guest vocals.

Lazarus is mainly influenced by hip-hop, although his "love for live instrumentation is still reflected on the record." "Billionaire", the album's first single, was a song McCoy began work on after abandoning the original material for the album. "I wasn't really happy, and that was coming though in a lot of my songs," McCoy recalled. Working on more uptempo music helped put him in a "different headspace." He credited his friends and collaborators on the album for helping him recover from his depressed state during the recording process. McCoy felt uncomfortable with his singing voice as he was more accustomed to rapping; however, T-Pain encouraged him to sing more on the album and overcome his insecurities.

McCoy "took a lot of time" with the track listing of the album to make sure the album was cohesive and felt like a "ride." He said of the album's writing process "With any project, I just go in and blindly start writing songs and then find out which way we want to go with it. This one took a bit longer to find the lane." Despite the album's long gestation period, McCoy was able to write some of the songs at a very rapid pace. The song "After Midnight" was written, recorded, and mixed in less than a half an hour. He began by recording himself humming the song's melody and creating a constant loop that repeated throughout the song, and then recorded his verses over the track.

McCoy also selected the guest appearances for the album quickly after writing individual parts of songs, choosing artists he felt would work best with the musical style he had in mind. The hook of "Dr. Feel Good" was written by Bruno Mars, and upon hearing Mars sing it, McCoy decided that Cee Lo Green would be a good candidate to sing the hook, as McCoy had idolized Green since his teenage years after listening to him on the song "Git Up, Git Out" from OutKast's debut album Southernplayalisticadillacmuzik (1994).

== Composition ==
=== Music ===
With Lazarus, McCoy intended to create an album of mostly uptempo, positive songs. During his time in Miami, he was exposed to EDM genres, which influenced Lazarus' sound. McCoy stated "If you're looking for an introspective, in-depth look into my personal life or my deepest emotions, this is definitely not the record. It's just a record you can put on, turn up, roll the windows down, and drive around to." He intended to save more personal themes for Gym Class Heroes' subsequent release, The Papercut Chronicles II (2011).

The album's opening track, "Dr. Feel-Good", which features Cee Lo Green, has been referred to as a "top-down summer anthem" and features hip-hop beats and funk-inspired guitar riffs. Emily Zemler of Alternative Press opined that "Superbad (11:34)" sounds like "T-Pain covering Linkin Park." The song was inspired by an inside joke between McCoy and a friend which involved superstition that looking at a digital clock at 11:34 is bad luck, as it reads "hell" upside down. He added, "To me, it's really anthemic and it's a confidence booster as well. When you listen to this song, it gets you prepared to do anything." "Billionaire", the album's lead single, displays reggae influences; Gregory Heaney of AllMusic compared the song to Sublime.

"Need You" has been described as an "R&B-tinged pop rocker" comparable to the work of Justin Timberlake. McCoy noted the contrast between the song's subject matter and musical style, as the song touches upon failed relationships in an uptempo manner and "explodes" as it reaches the chorus. In the same vein of "Need You", McCoy described "Critical", featuring Tim William, as "really personal, introspective subject matter put into an upbeat pop song. It's kind of like a rock song, but at the same time, it has this really shimmery, cute vibe to it." "Akidagain" features a children's choir and samples Ahmad's "Back in the Day." "We'll Be Alright", which McCoy refers to as a "party anthem", samples "Alright" by Supergrass. He described the album's closer "Don't Pretend" as "probably the most personal" song on the album; during recording of the song, he suffered from allergies and had difficulty breathing, which "added to the emotional vibe of the song."

=== Lyrics ===
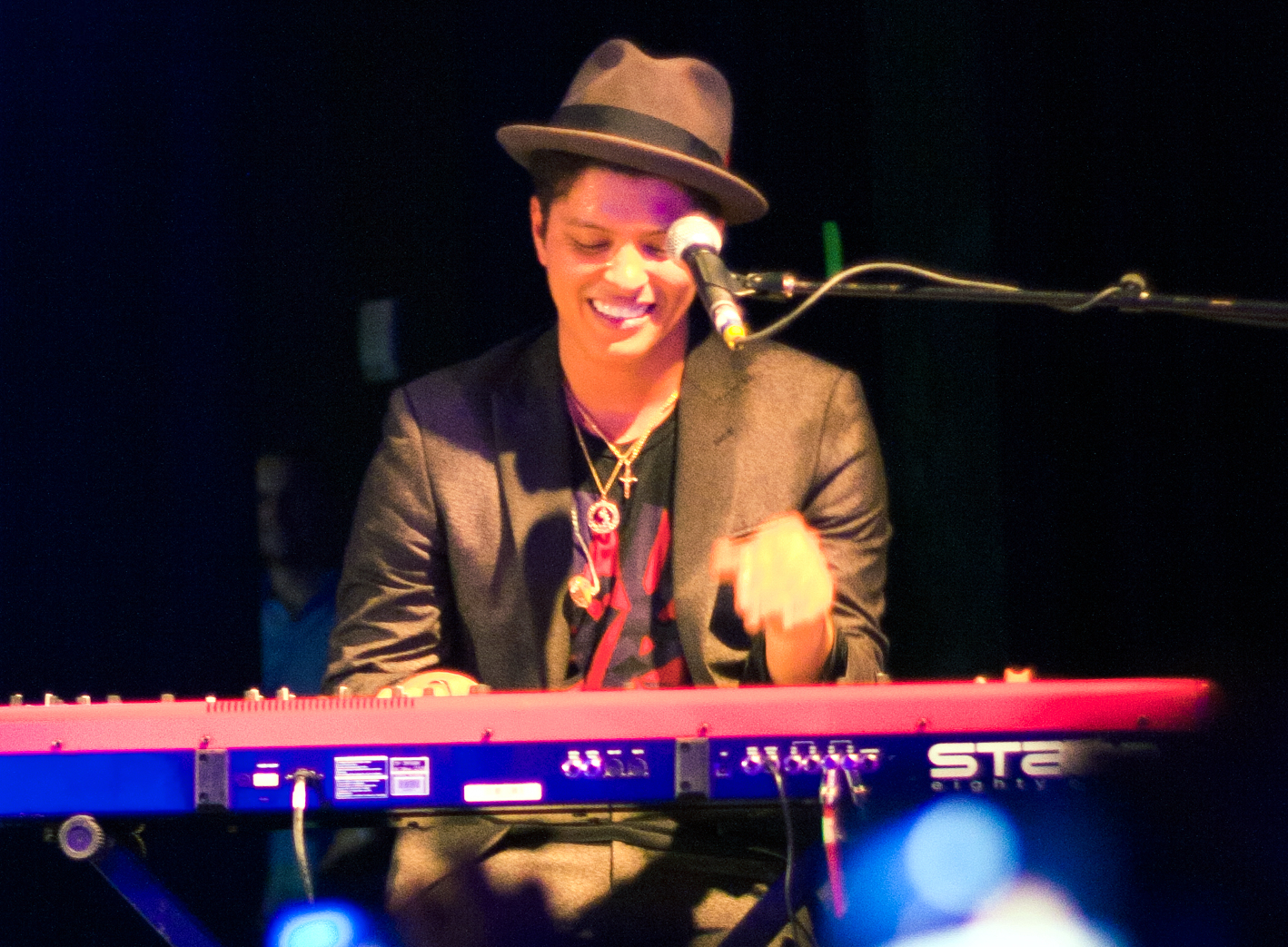
Bruno Mars wrote the lyrics to "Billionaire" while producing an album for the Sugababes in London.

The album's lyrics range in subject matter from partying and personal insecurities to overcoming grief. McCoy explained that the opening song "Dr. Feel Good" is about "escapism through music" and that it expresses how he felt about recovering from drug addiction and depression. "Superbad (11:34)" is about McCoy's experiences on the road, and he considered the song to be his "theme song."

Bruno Mars came up with the lyrical concept for "Billionaire" during a trip to London in which he was given £250 ($350) by his record label to spend for 11 days. He found the amount of money to be insufficient, and explained "We were like, 'Is this the biggest mistake we've ever made? We thought we were broke in California; what are we going to do here?' So we've got no money, and I'm walking the streets and came up with, 'I wanna be a billionaire, so frickin' bad.'" With the song, McCoy intended to avoid "superficial" lyrics in the wake of an economic recession, and added "There's something to sing about here; if I was in the position to have a ridiculous amount of money, would I be selfish or selfless?' I just took that concept and ran with it."

McCoy wrote "Need You" about his former girlfriend Katy Perry. The song describes a situation in which a person wants to start a new relationship, but still needs time to heal. "Critical" is an apocalyptic-themed song inspired by natural disasters such as Hurricane Katrina. McCoy explained that the song discusses these subjects in "a tongue-in-cheek way. Basically, if the world was to end tonight, fuck it--lets have a beer and watch it all go down." "Akidagain" is reflective of McCoy's childhood and pop culture shifts that influenced his life, featuring three verses; in the first verse, he discusses his early childhood, the second verse is about his teenage years, and the final verse meditates on his life as an adult. McCoy said that the song "We'll Be Alright" is about "not caring about what people think and just ignoring your insecurities."

McCoy was given the idea for "The Manual" after reading music blogs that were critical of his music. He explained "It's so easy to get online and lose all your inhibitions and complain and nag about what's wrong with music. But if you're going to do that, offer some way to change things. Or make music. A lot of the people aren't even artists. The title of 'The Manual' is asking if there is a manual out there on how to do things the right way, then please show it to me and I'll read it five times over." "After Midnight" was inspired by the movie Gremlins, and the idea that seeing gremlins after midnight means "trouble."

== Packaging and title ==
McCoy chose the name for the album, which is also his middle name, after his experiences in charity work in HIV awareness in South Africa, India, and the Philippines in the summer of 2009 that "really changed [his] outlook on life." Lazarus of Bethany is the subject of a miracle in the New Testament of the Bible in which Jesus restores him back to life after being dead for four days. McCoy said of the name "I never really thought about how synonymous it was with the biblical reference with the fact that my middle name is Lazarus. I feel like I've been dead and resurrected on many occasions. I went public with a lot of dark things that people usually keep in the closet like drug addiction and what not." The album was originally titled "The Lazarus Project", but the name had to be changed due to the 2008 drama film of the same name.

The album's artwork, designed by Brent Rollins and Alex R. Kirzhner, features a recurring theme of clouds and city skylines. Amber McDonald of The Daily Loaf felt that the artwork accurately portrayed the album's key themes: "This convincingly fun record is filled with lyrical introspection and, in spite of all its hip-hop, pop-hook, pay-it-forward-ness, there are gray clouds that work to keep the mood of the album realistic and relatable to the worlds of listeners. After all, the album cover art is of a gray backdrop with clouds, not sunshine and blue skies."

== Release and promotion ==
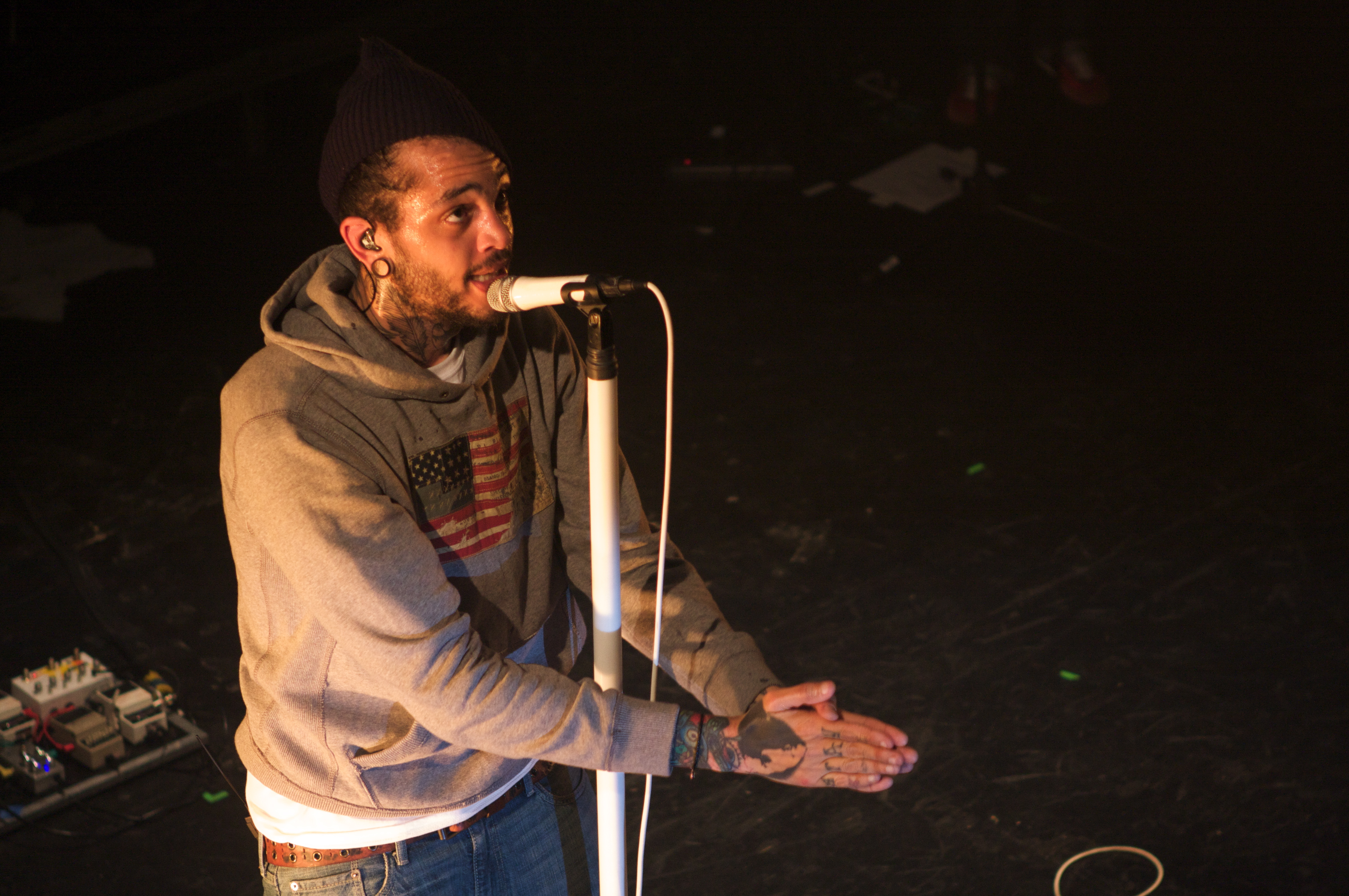
McCoy performing on March 18, 2011, in Montreal as part as the Sgt. Schlepper's Who Needs Hearts Club Band Tour.

The album was released on June 8, 2010. McCoy aimed for a June release because he believes that summer is "when most of the memorable music drops. You want music to have a good time to, music to connect to. You wanna play it at the party."

On April 28, 2010, McCoy embarked on the Too Fast For Love tour with Cobra Starship and 3OH!3, featuring a backup band that includes Gym Class Heroes drummer Matt McGinley. He planned to tour extensively to promote the album in order to make the album "a household object—and hopefully not a coaster." Starting from October 18, 2010, McCoy set off on his first solo European headline tour along with Bruno Mars who supported the tour throughout. The majority of dates took place at smaller venues throughout the United Kingdom. On March 17, 2011, he began performing throughout the United States and Canada on the Sgt. Schlepper's Who Needs Hearts Club Band Tour featuring Black Cards.

=== Singles ===
In early May 2010, McCoy released "Billionaire" as the album's lead single, which debuted on the Billboard Hot 100 at 92. "Billionaire" continued to be successful, peaking at number four on the Billboard Hot 100 chart. The song was positioned at number six on the Billboard "Songs of Summer 2010" chart. The next single, "Need You", was released to mainstream radio on September 14, 2010, and peaked at number 36 on the Billboard Pop Songs chart. "We'll Be Alright" was also released as a single by Pete Wentz on May 17, 2010 on his blog. However, the single failed to make an impact on any of the Billboard charts.

== Critical reception ==
Professional ratings
Aggregate scores
Source	Rating
Metacritic	68/100
Review scores
Source	Rating
AllMusic	3/5 stars
Blare Magazine	3.5/5 stars
DJBooth.net	3.5/5 stars
The Independent	2/5 stars
Rolling Stone	2.5/5 stars
Spin	3.5/5 stars
USA Today	3/4 stars

Reviews of the album were generally mixed to positive. Spin's Mikael Wood gave the album 3½ out of 5 stars and commended its pop-oriented sound, stating "most of Lazarus is so bright you'll need (designer) shades." Gregory Heaney of AllMusic called "Akidagain" the "real highlight of the album" and stated that "Even though every track on the album isn't a keeper, it has some solid additions to any summer playlist and will definitely please fans of Gym Class Heroes." Jerry Shriver of USA Today praised the album's "all-night party gems" and referred to "The Manual" as the album's "true keeper" and praised the song's introspective lyrics. Melanie Bertoldi of Billboard agreed with Shriver about "The Manual", and praised the album's "relatable themes" further commenting that "The 10-track album's inclusion of reggae-influenced beats and dance jams may polarize listeners, but its snappy wordplay and deep introspection will appeal to a wide demographic of music lovers." Emily Zemler of Alternative Press awarded the album four out of five stars and deemed McCoy's singing to be "the most engaging thing" about the album: "Not only are the tracks incredibly catchy, but McCoy belts out his choruses like he's just discovered his voice."

Nathan Slavik of DJBooth.com called Lazarus a "smile-inducing, high quality hip-pop album from a distinctly creative and original voice", praising the record's uptempo yet dark songs. Entertainment Weekly's Brad Wete gave the album a B+ and commended McCoy for keeping with Gym Class's hip-hop/rock style, calling the album "a summery set that serves as a nice break from Class." Drew Beringer of AbsolutePunk enjoyed the album's upbeat songs and noted a departure from McCoy's earlier work, commenting "Full of summer time jams, it's hard to imagine this is the same guy who rapped about desolate times and experiences in his band's second album The Papercut Chronicles (2005)…This is not a world-beater by any means, but it shows some growth in McCoy as an artist and lets him get out his ideas before recording and releasing the next Gym Class Heroes album."

However, not all reviews were positive. Jon Dolan of Rolling Stone gave the album 2½ out of 5 stars, calling his crooning-style rapping "more unctuous than charming." Blare Magazine criticized the over-abundance of guest appearances and likened the album to "a newborn child forced out of a hip-hop womb by 13 different fathers", while opining that McCoy still demonstrates musical potential. Mike Diver of the BBC was highly critical of the disc, noting that "McCoy employs too many disparate styles...for Lazarus to hold any attention for more than a fleeting period." Although Diver praised Cee Lo Green's "spotlight-stealing" contribution to "Dr. Feel Good", he referred to "We'll Be Alright" as "repulsive" and the reggae stylings of "Billionaire" as "horribly dated." Andy Gill of The Independent felt that although the disc had songs with potential to be hits such as "Dr. Feelgood" and "We'll Be Alright", the remainder of the songs "expose McCoy's shortcomings" and the album is "unlikely to make him a household name."

== Commercial performance ==
On the week of June 26, 2010, Lazarus debuted at No. 25 on the US Billboard 200 chart, with sales of 15,000 copies in its first week. The album also debuted at No. 11 on the Billboard Digital Albums chart. As of April 2012, the album has sold more than 75,000 copies in the United States. On May 17, 2019, the album was certified gold by the Recording Industry Association of America (RIAA) for sales of over 500,000 copies in the United States.

On August 21, 2010, Lazarus was released in Europe. In the United Kingdom, debuted at No. 69 on the UK Albums Chart.

== Track listing ==
Lazarus track listing
No.	Title	Writer(s)	Producer(s)	Length
1.	"Dr. Feel Good" (featuring Cee-Lo Green)	Thomas Callaway; Bruno Mars; Philip Lawrence; Ari Levine; Travis McCoy	The Smeezingtons	3:54
2.	"Superbad (11:34)" (featuring DJ Frank E)	Justin Franks; McCoy	DJ Frank E; Wes Borland	3:12
3.	"Billionaire" (featuring Bruno Mars)	Mars; Lawrence; Levine; McCoy	The Smeezingtons	3:31
4.	"Need You"	Wayne Hector; Lucas Secon; Carsten Mortensen; McCoy	Lucas Secon	3:23
5.	"Critical" (featuring Tim William)	McCoy	Andrew "Drew" Correa	3:17
6.	"Akidagain"	John Klemmer; Ahmad Lewis; Stefan Gordy; McCoy	Infamous	3:42
7.	"We'll Be Alright"	Rob Coombes; Danny Goffey; Lawrence; Mars; Mick Quinn; Jonathan Yip; Ray Romulus; Jeremy Reeves	The Smeezingtons; Stereotypes	3:17
8.	"The Manual" (featuring T-Pain and Young Cash)	Faheem Najm; Joseph Williams; McCoy	Hannon Lane	4:10
9.	"After Midnight"	Evan Bogart; Oliver Goldstein; McCoy	Josh Abraham; Oligee	3:46
10.	"Don't Pretend" (featuring Colin Munroe and Travis Barker)	Chad Burnette; McCoy	Chad Beatz	3:06

Japanese bonus track
No.	Title	Writer(s)	Producer(s)	Length
11.	"Billionaire" (remix; featuring Bruno Mars, T-Pain, One Chance and Gucci Mane)	Peter Hernandez; Faheem Najm; Radric Davis; Ari Levine; John Gordon; Michael Gordon; Travis McCoy	The Smeezingtons	4:54

iTunes standard edition bonus track
No.	Title	Writer(s)	Producer(s)	Length
11.	"She Did It"	McCoy; Nathan Payton; Samuel Jean	Tommy Hittz	3:56

iTunes deluxe edition bonus tracks
No.	Title	Writer(s)	Producer(s)	Length
11.	"Ms. Tattoo Girl" (featuring T-Pain and Detail)	Travis McCoy; Faheem Najm; Dwayne Carter Jr.; Noel Fisher	Detail	3:23
12.	"She Did It"	McCoy; Payton; Jean	Tommy Hittz	3:56
13.	"Bad All by Myself"	McCoy; Payton; Jean	Tommy Hittz	4:02
14.	"Billionaire" (music video)			3:33

US deluxe edition bonus DVD
No.	Title	Length
1.	"Travie McCoy: The Four Day Theory" (Documentary)	30:00

Sample credits

- "Akidagain" interpolates "Back in the Day" by Ahmad.
- "We'll Be Alright" contains a sample of "Alright" by Supergrass.

== Personnel ==
Credits for Lazarus adapted from AllMusic.

- Travie McCoy – composer, vocals, producer
- Bruno Mars – composer, producer
- Javier Valverde – engineer
- Pete Wentz – executive producer
- Ryan Williams – engineer, mixing
- Josh Abraham – guitar, producer
- Elvis Aponte – engineer
- Dave Benck – engineer
- E. Kidd Bogart – composer
- Wes Borland – guitar, producer
- Brody Brown – bass guitar
- C. Burnette – composer
- Cee Lo Green – composer
- Chad Beatz – producer
- Drew Correa – producer
- Steve Fiction – guitar
- Victor Flores – mixing
- Frank E. – producer
- J. Franks – composer
- Elizabeth Gallardo – assistant
- Chris Gehringer – mastering
- Rob Gold – art manager, producer
- O. Goldstein – composer
- W. Hector – composer
- Eric Hernandez – drums
- Jaycen Joshua – mixing
- Chad Jolley – engineer, vocal engineer
- Brandon Jones – assistant
- Alex Kirzhner – design, layout
- J. Klemmer – composer
- Hannon Lane – producer
- Philip Lawrence – composer
- Ari Levine – engineer, mixing, vocal engineer, composer
- A. Lewis – composer
- Giancarlo Lino – assistant
- Fabian Marasciullo – mixing
- Bruno Mars – vocals, backing vocals
- Graham Marsh – engineer
- George Mayers – engineer
- Tommy Hittz – producer
- Charles Monez – bass
- Colin Munroe – vocals
- Travis Barker – drums
- Oligee – keyboards, producer
- Chris Phelps – photography
- Michelle Piza – package manager
- J. Reeves – composer
- Brent Rollins – cover design
- Lucas Secon – producer
- The Smeezingtons – musician, producer
- The Stereotypes – drum programming, engineer, producer
- T-Pain – composer
- Betty Wright – director
- The Wrighteous – vocals
- Young Cash – composer

== Charts ==
Chart performance for Lazarus
Chart (2010)	Peak position
UK Albums (Official Charts)	69
UK Album Downloads (Official Charts)	35
UK R&B Albums (Official Charts)	11
US Billboard 200	25

== Certifications ==
Certifications for Lazarus
Region	Certification	Certified units/sales
United States (RIAA)	Gold	500,000^{^}
^{^} Shipments figures based on certification alone.
