= The Fighter (Gym Class Heroes song) =

Single by Gym Class Heroes featuring Ryan Tedder

from the album The Papercut Chronicles II
- Released: November 8, 2011
- Recorded: 2011
- Genre: Pop-rap; alternative hip hop; synthpop; alternative rock
- Length: 3:49
- Label: Fueled by Ramen
- Songwriters: Travie McCoy; Disashi Lumumba-Kasongo; Eric Roberts; Matt McGinley; Ryan Tedder; Noel Zancanella; Jamie Heffernan
- Producer: Ryan Tedder

Gym Class Heroes singles chronology
"Ass Back Home" (2011)	"The Fighter" (2011)	"Martyrial Girls" (2012)

Ryan Tedder singles chronology
"Gonna Get Over You" (2011)	"The Fighter" (2011)	"The Missing" (2016)

Music video
- "The Fighter" on YouTube

"The Fighter" is a song by American rap rock band Gym Class Heroes, from their fifth studio album The Papercut Chronicles II. The song features vocals from American singer-songwriter and record producer Ryan Tedder of the band OneRepublic, and was released as the third and final single from the album on November 8, 2011. It was featured in the season finale of 90210 season 4 and the Cathay Pacific television commercial for the 2013 Hong Kong Sevens, as well as the background music of the introduction video of F1 2014.

== Music video ==
The music video for "The Fighter" was filmed in April 2012. It was released to YouTube on May 24, 2012. The video features American gymnast John Orozco. It depicts Tedder playing at an upright piano, and the band members around him singing and playing their instruments. Shots of Orozco doing Olympic training in a gym, as well as clips of home video of him competing as a child are shown in between. The single was written by several writers, including all four Gym Class Heroes members, Tedder, Noel Zancanella and Jamie Heffernan.

== Track listing ==
Digital download
No.	Title	Length
1.	"The Fighter" (featuring Ryan Tedder)	3:49

== Charts ==
=== Weekly charts ===
Chart (2011–2012)	Peak position
Australia (ARIA)	7
Belgium (Ultratip Bubbling Under Wallonia)	18
Canada Hot 100 (Billboard)	35
Ireland (IRMA)	15
New Zealand (Recorded Music NZ)	4
UK Singles (OCC)	44
UK Hip Hop/R&B (Official Charts)	15
US Billboard Hot 100	25
US Adult Pop Airplay (Billboard)	27
US Pop Airplay (Billboard)	13

=== Year-end charts ===
Chart (2012)	Position
Australia (ARIA)	73

== Certifications ==
Region	Certification	Certified units/sales
Australia (ARIA)	2× Platinum	140,000^{^}
New Zealand (RMNZ)	Gold	7,500^{*}
United States (RIAA)	Platinum	1,000,000^{‡}
^{*} Sales figures based on certification alone.^{^} Shipments figures based on certification alone.^{‡} Sales+streaming figures based on certification alone.

== Release history ==
Release dates and formats for "The Fighter"
Region	Date	Format	Label(s)	Ref.
United States	May 8, 2012	Mainstream airplay	Fueled By Ramen	

== Cover version ==
"The Fighter" was covered by alternative rock band Paradise Fears in 2012.
