= Ass Back Home =

2011 single by Gym Class Heroes

Single by Gym Class Heroes featuring Neon Hitch

from the album The Papercut Chronicles II
- Released: October 31, 2011
- Recorded: 2011
- Genre: Pop rap
- Length: 3:42
- Label: Fueled by Ramen
- Songwriters: Travie McCoy; Disashi Lumumba-Kasongo; Eric Roberts; Matt McGinley; Benjamin Levin; Ammar Malik; Daniel Omelio
- Producers: Benny Blanco; Robopop

Gym Class Heroes singles chronology
"Stereo Hearts" (2011)	"Ass Back Home" (2011)	"The Fighter" (2011)

Neon Hitch singles chronology
"Bad Dog" (2011)	"Ass Back Home" (2011)	"Fuck U Betta" (2012)

Music video
- "Ass Back Home" on YouTube

"Ass Back Home" (edited version titled as "Get Yourself Back Home") is a song by American group Gym Class Heroes featuring British singer-songwriter Neon Hitch. The song was first released on October 31, 2011, as the second single from the group's fifth studio album, The Papercut Chronicles II. The track was co-written and produced by Benny Blanco, who also produced previous hit "Stereo Hearts". "Ass Back Home" became the group's third biggest hit on the Billboard Hot 100 when it peaked at number 12, also reaching number one in Australia, 11 in New Zealand, number 10 in Ireland, and 9 in The United Kingdom.

== Composition ==
"Ass Back Home" is a midtempo pop song that runs for 3 minutes and 39 seconds. It follows through a percussive beat influenced by electro. The song contains influences of dub, rock and reggae and features the use of a "shimmering" guitar. The overall sound of the song has been described as "breezy". The lyrics are centered around the troubles a couple experiences when one partner is away on business. The male protagonist sings praises to his partner as the female protagonist urges her partner to come home. Melinda Newman of HitFix.com interprets that the state of union between the two protagonists are strong. Matt Lovett of The Lantern found the lyrics to be "hollow" and interpreted them as an attempt "to discuss some sort of personal conflict about being where "one belongs."

== Critical reception ==
Kyle Anderson of Entertainment Weekly praised the song as "stealthily sincere". Rick Florino of ARTISTdirect praised the song's unique style, writing "Neon Hitch's gorgeous line entwines with McCoy's rapping for a combination like no other." Chad Grischow of IGN named "Ass Back Home" the best track on the album, writing "The breezy dub rock flavor of shimmering guitar and an adorable hook from Neon Hitch turn 'Ass Back Home' into the best of the album, as McCoy's beat-riding flow works wonders as he sings the praises of his patient woman." Jordy Kasko of The Tune wrote that the song could be a potential hit, along with "The Fighter". Matt Lovett of UWIRE wrote that the song, along with "Holy Horseshit, Batman", "sound like reflections of a 13-year-old finally using the naughty language he learned at school in his diary." Austin Gordon of Mind Equals Blown wrote that "could easily stir lots of radio play if they choose". Megan Westerby of Live Music Guide finds the song to be "directionless and overly repetitive."

Robert Copsey of Digital Spy rated the song four out of five stars, writing that "The result makes for a more fascinating collab than if, say, they'd roped Ke$ha in on the track (although we wouldn't be adverse to that either), as Hitch's fresh but distinctive vocal ticks make for a far more interesting listen. In fact, she easily steals the show here, cracking the whip on an AWOL Trav on the head-nodding and Big Mac-sized chorus. That she manages to succeed on that alone is a huge achievement in itself."

== Chart performance ==
"Ass Back Home" made its first chart appearance in Ireland on the chart week ending February 2, 2012 – when it debuted at number twenty-seven on the Irish Singles Chart. On its second charting week, the single rose seventeen places to number ten, marking the group's fourth top ten hit in the country; after "Cupid's Chokehold", "Clothes Off!!" and "Stereo Hearts".

== Music video ==
A lyrical music video was made available onto YouTube on October 31, 2011 to accompany the release of "Ass Back Home", at a total length of three minutes and forty-four seconds. An official music video, directed by Dugan O' Neal was then made available on December 9, 2011—amassing over eighty-three million views as of June 19, 2021. The music video features Neon Hitch as Travie McCoy's girlfriend. It shows clips of him and the rest of the band on the road and on tour also showing clips of Neon Hitch at home and sad without Travie. At the end Travie returns home and embraces Neon Hitch.

== Track listing ==
Digital download
No.	Title	Length
1.	"Ass Back Home" (featuring Neon Hitch)	3:42

Digital EP
No.	Title	Length
1.	"Ass Back Home" (featuring Neon Hitch)	3:42
2.	"Ass Back Home" (featuring Neon Hitch) (Black Cards Remix)	5:12
3.	"Ass Back Home" (featuring Neon Hitch) (Ken Loi Extended Mix)	5:42

== Charts ==
=== Weekly charts ===
Chart (2011–2012)	Peak position
Australia (ARIA)	1
Belgium (Ultratip Bubbling Under Flanders)	59
Belgium (Ultratip Bubbling Under Wallonia)	15
Canada Hot 100 (Billboard)	24
Ireland (IRMA)	10
Netherlands (Single Top 100)	81
New Zealand (Recorded Music NZ)	11
Norway (VG-lista)	15
Scotland Singles (Official Charts)	7
Slovakia Airplay (ČNS IFPI)	45
UK Singles (Official Charts)	9
UK Hip Hop/R&B (Official Charts)	3
US Billboard Hot 100	12
US Adult Pop Airplay (Billboard)	38
US Dance Airplay (Billboard)	14
US Pop Airplay (Billboard)	5
US Rhythmic Airplay (Billboard)	16

=== Year-end charts ===
Chart (2012)	Position
Australia (ARIA)	33
Canada (Canadian Hot 100)	83
US Billboard Hot 100	51
US Mainstream Top 40 (Billboard)	31

== Certifications ==
Region	Certification	Certified units/sales
Australia (ARIA)	3× Platinum	210,000^{^}
Canada (Music Canada)	Gold	40,000^{*}
New Zealand (RMNZ)	2× Platinum	60,000^{‡}
United Kingdom (BPI)	Silver	200,000^{‡}
United States (RIAA)	Platinum	1,000,000^{*}
Streaming
Denmark (IFPI Danmark)	Gold	450,000^{†}
^{*} Sales figures based on certification alone.^{^} Shipments figures based on certification alone.^{‡} Sales+streaming figures based on certification alone.^{†} Streaming-only figures based on certification alone.

== Release history ==
Region	Date	Format	Label
New Zealand	November 1, 2011	Digital download	Fueled by Ramen
Spain	November 1, 2011	Digital download	Fueled by Ramen
United States	November 22, 2011	Mainstream airplay	Fueled by Ramen
United Kingdom	February 19, 2012	Digital download	Fueled by Ramen

== Covers ==
Post-hardcore band, Secrets, covered the track for the compilation album Punk Goes Pop 5, which was released on November 6, 2012.
