= Life Goes On (Gym Class Heroes song) =

Promotional single by Gym Class Heroes featuring Oh Land

from the album The Papercut Chronicles II
- Released: October 18, 2011
- Recorded: 2011
- Genre: Pop rap
- Length: 4:11
- Label: Fueled by Ramen
- Songwriters: Travie McCoy; Disashi Lumumba-Kasongo; Eric Roberts; Matt McGinley; Annie Clark; Emile Haynie
- Producer: Emile Haynie

Music video
- "Life Goes On" on YouTube

"Life Goes On" is a song by American alternative hip hop band Gym Class Heroes, released October 18, 2011 as the first promotional single from their fifth studio album The Papercut Chronicles II. The song, produced by Emile Haynie, features vocals from Danish singer-songwriter and record producer Oh Land.

The official audio, was uploaded to YouTube on October 18, 2011 at a total length of four minutes and twelve seconds.

== Track listing ==
Digital download
No.	Title	Length
1.	"Life Goes On" (feat. Oh Land)	4:11

== Release history ==
Region	Date	Format	Label
United States	18 October 2011	Digital Download	Fueled by Ramen
