= Taxi Driver (song) =

Single by Gym Class Heroes

from the album The Papercut Chronicles
- Released: 2004; 23 October 2004 (UK)
- Recorded: 2004
- Genre: Alternative hip hop
- Length: 1:59
- Label: Decaydance, Fueled by Ramen
- Songwriter: Travis McCoy
- Producer: Travis McCoy

Gym Class Heroes singles chronology
"Taxi Driver" (2004)	"Papercuts" (2005)

Music video
- "Taxi Driver" on YouTube

"Taxi Driver" is a song by rap rock group Gym Class Heroes. The song was first released on The Papercut EP, but was also included on the full-length and much more widely released The Papercut Chronicles. In the song's lyrics, frontman Travis McCoy namechecks 26 other bands and artists that Gym Class Heroes enjoy. "Taxi Driver" was the very first video produced for Gym Class Heroes. It was produced by Bill Pealer, Jason Gillotti, and Ryan Smith long before the band was attached to any record label.

The song was named #20 of the "50 Worst Songs of the '00s" in a 2009 Village Voice article.

== Referenced bands (in order of mention) ==
Lead vocalist Travie McCoy has claimed he is unsure as to all the bands referenced, suggesting there are allusions to other bands despite their names not being mentioned. They also mention their recording label, Fueled by Ramen, in the last line.

- Death Cab for Cutie
- Dashboard Confessional
- Cursive
- Bright Eyes
- Sunny Day Real Estate
- My Chemical Romance
- Hey Mercedes
- Coheed and Cambria
- Fall Out Boy
- Jimmy Eat World
- Thrice
- Brand New
- The Postal Service
- Planes Mistaken for Stars
- At the Drive-In
- ...And You Will Know Us by the Trail of Dead
- Midtown
- The Get Up Kids
- Scraps and Heart Attacks
- The Early November
- Thursday
- Taking Back Sunday
- Jets to Brazil
- Story of the Year
- Hot Water Music
- Elliott
