= Ricky Reed Is Real =

Studio album by Wallpaper.
- Released: July 23, 2013
- Genres: Pop, hip-hop, electronic
- Labels: Boardwalk; Epic
- Producer: Ricky Reed

Wallpaper. chronology
'#STUPiDFACEDD' (2012)	Ricky Reed Is Real (2013)

Singles from Ricky Reed Is Real
- 1. "Good 4 It" Released: March 12, 2013; 2. "Hesher" Released: January 2014

Ricky Reed Is Real is the second studio album and debut major-label release by American hip-hop and pop music project Wallpaper. The album was released on July 23, 2013, to stores and digital retailers through Boardwalk Records and Epic Records.

== Singles ==
"Good 4 It" was released as the lead single on March 12, 2013.

"Hesher" was released as the second single off of the album in January 2014.

=== Promotional singles ===
"Drunken Hearts" was released as the first promotional single off of the album on June 18, 2013, along with the pre-order of the album. The song was used in the trailer for the comedy film That Awkward Moment (2014).

== Track listing ==
All songs produced by Eric Frederic (Ricky Reed).

No.	Title	Writer(s)	Length
1.	"RRiR"	Eric Frederic, Tom Peyton, Mick Coogan	4:29
2.	"Geek Out" (feat. E-40)	Frederic, Daniel Omelio, Earl Stevens	3:57
3.	"Last Call"	Frederic, Peyton, Coogan	3:32
4.	"Drunken Hearts"	Frederic, Ammar Malik	3:36
5.	"Hesher"	Frederic	3:08
6.	"The Underdog"	Frederic, Omelio	4:05
7.	"Let's Get Away with It"	Frederic, T.A. Shuller, Peyton	3:38
8.	"Good 4 It"	Frederic, Peyton	3:40
9.	"Puke My Brains Out"	Frederic	3:19
10.	"Life of the Party"	Frederic, Omelio	3:45
11.	"WHO RLY CRS"	Frederic, Peyton, E. Kidd Bogart, Malik	3:53
12.	"You n Me n Everyone We Know"	Frederic, Shuller	3:44
Total length:			44:46

== Credits and personnel ==
Credits for Ricky Reed Is Real adapted from AllMusic.

- Axident - Engineer, Instrumentation, Producer, Programming
- Evan "Kidd" Bogart - A&R, Composer, Executive Producer
- Timothy Bogart - Executive Producer
- Novena Carmel - Featured Artist, Vocals
- Mick Coogan - Composer, Instrumentation, Programming
- E-40 - Featured Artist
- Aubrey Forman - Project Coordinator
- Eric Frederic - Composer
- Chris Gehringer - Mastering
- Serban Ghenea - Mixing
- Tyquan Gholson - Assistant
- Dakarai "Dg" Gwitira - Engineer
- John Hanes - Mixing Engineer
- Trehy Harris - Mixing Assistant
- Jaycen Joshua - Mixing
- Drew Kapner - Engineer
- Sam Locca - Creative Director
- Ammar Malick - Composer
- Jonathan Mann - Engineer
- Meg Margossian - Assistant
- Edwin Menjivar - Engineer
- Dan Omelio - Composer, Engineer, Instrumentation, Programming
- Tom Peyton - Composer, Instrumentation, Programming
- David "DQ" Quinones - Engineer, Vocal Producer
- Gary Randall - Executive Producer
- Ricky Reed - Art Direction, Engineer, Executive Producer, Instrumentation, Producer, Programming
- Robopop - Producer
- A. Schuller - Composer
- T.A. Schuller - Composer
- Mark "Spike" Stent - Mixing
- Earl Stevens - Composer
- Tricky Stewart - A&R, Executive Producer
- Brian "B-Luv" Thomas - Engineer
- Treehouse Family - Vocals (Background)
- Larry Wade - A&R
- Wallpaper. - Primary Artist
- Rami Yacoub - Vocal Producer

== Charts ==
Chart (2013)	Peak position
US Heatseekers Albums (Billboard)	10
