= Robopop =

US-based record producer and songwriter

- Born: Daniel Omelio; United States
- Genres: Rock; pop
- Occupations: Musician; singer-songwriter; record producer
- Instruments: Synthesizer; keyboards

Daniel Omelio, often known by his stage name "Robopop", is a producer and songwriter based in Los Angeles. He is best known for his work on successful singles by Maroon 5, Gym Class Heroes and Lana Del Rey.

== Discography ==
Year	Artist(s)	Song	Album	Songwriter	Producer
2011	Gym Class Heroes f/ Adam Levine	"Stereo Hearts"	The Papercut Chronicles II	check	check
2011	Gym Class Heroes f/ Neon Hitch	"Ass Back Home"	The Papercut Chronicles II	check	check
2011	Lana Del Rey	"Video Games"	Born to Die		check
2012	Sean Paul	"Put It on You"	Tomahawk Technique	check	
2012	Maroon 5	"Payphone"	Overexposed	check	check
2012	Adam Lambert	"Naked Love"	Trespassing	check	
2012	Rome	"Seasons"	Dedication EP	check	check
2012	Rome	"Oz of Love"	Dedication EP	check	check
2012	Marina & The Diamonds	"How to Be a Heartbreaker"	Electra Heart	check	
2012	Owl City	"Shooting Star"	The Midsummer Station	check	
2012	Cher Lloyd f/ Becky G	"Oath"	Sticks + Stones	check	check
2012	Kesha	"Thinking of You"	Warrior	check	
2012	Kesha	"Last Goodbye"	Warrior	check	
2013	Travie McCoy f/ Jason Mraz	"Rough Water"	TBD	check	check
2013	Keith Urban	"Shame"	Fuse	check	
2013	Jessie J	"Harder We Fall"	Alive	check	
2013	Twin Forks	"Cross My Mind"	TBA	check	check
2013	Gavin Degraw	"Make a Move"	Make a Move	check	check
2013	James Blunt	"Heart to Heart"	Moon Landing	check	check
2013	Lady Antebellum	"Compass"	Golden	check	
2014	Timeflies	"Fall"	TBD	check	check
2014	Charli XCX	"Break the Rules"	Sucker	check	
2014	Justice Crew	"Rise & Fall"	TBD	check	check
2014	Melanie Martinez	"Bittersweet Tragedy"	Dollhouse (EP)	check	check
2014	James Blunt	"When I Find Love Again"	When I Find Love Again EP	check	
2014	Prince Royce	Stuck on a Feeling	Double Vision	check	
2014	Cedric Gervais	"Love Again"	TBD	check	
2014	Nick Jonas	"Take Over"	Nick Jonas	check	check
2015	JoJo	"When Love Hurts"	III.	check	
2015	Hunter Hayes	"Young and In Love"	Young and In Love - Single	check	
2015	Rixton	"Wait On Me"	Let The Road	check	
2015	Rixton	"We All Want The Same Thing"	Let The Road	check	check
2015	Rico Love	"Somebody Else"	Turn The Lights On		check
2015	The Heydaze	"Headlights"	Side Effects	check	check
2015	Jake Miller	"Sunshine"	Rumors - EP	check	check
2016	Britney Spears	"Just Luv Me"	Glory	check	check
2016	Little Mix	"Power"	Glory Days	check	check
2016	Birdy	"Lifted"	Beautiful Lies	check	
2017	Betty Who	"Mama Say"	The Valley		check
2017	Betty Who	"Reunion"	The Valley	check	check
2017	Andy Grammer	"This Ain't Love"	The Good Parts	check	check
2017	Andy Grammer	"Workin On It"	The Good Parts	check	check
2017	Superfruit	"Heartthrob"	Future Friends	check	check
2017	DENM	"Bless Your Heart"	Bless Your Heart - Single	check	check
2017	Liza Owen	"Don't Call Me Baby"	Don't Call Me Baby - Single	check	check
2017	Andrew McMahon in the Wilderness	"Fire Escape"	Zombies On Broadway	check	check
2017	Wafia	"Bodies"	Bodies - Single	check	check
2018	Thirty Seconds to Mars	"One Track Mind"	America	check	check
2018	Michael Blume	"Lifting You"	cynicism & sincerity	check	check
2018	Mikky Ekko	"Light The Way"	FAME	check	check
2018	Lil Aaron	"Stunt"	Rock$tar Famou$	check	check
2018	LP	"Die For Your Love"	Heart to Mouth	check	check
2019	Tritonal	"Gonna Be Alright (feat. Mozella)"	U & Me	check	
2019	Andy Grammer	"Born For This"	Naive	check	check
2019	Frenship	"Wide Open"	Vacation	check	check
2019	Joy Oladokun	"sunday"	in defense of my own happiness (complete)		check
2019	Marc Scibilia	"90's"	90's - Single		check
2019	Soaky Siren	"Quality (feat. Bantu)"	Quality - Single	check	check
2019	Shaylen	"Own Way"	Highs and Lows - EP	check	check
2020	Justice Carradine	“Necessary Evil”	Necessary Evil - Single	check	check
2020	Weezer	“Hero”	Hero - Single	check	
2020	Elle King	"The Let Go"	The Let Go - Single	check	check
2020	Willie Shaw	“Needed Somebody”	Needed Somebody - Single		check
2020	Willie Shaw	“Come Through”	Come Through - Single		check
2020	Chaz Cardigan	“Room”	Room - Single	check	check
2021	Martin Jensen	"Faith"	Faith - Single	check	
2022	Weezer	N/A	SZNZ: Summer		check
2022	Weezer	Disc 1 + Disc 2	SZNZ: Autumn		check
2022	Chelsea Collins	"WHO MADE YOU GOD?"	WHO MADE YOU GOD? - Single	check	check
2022	NGHTMARE, SLANDER	"Monster"	Monster - Single	check	
2022	Andrew McMahon In The Wilderness	"VHS"	VHS - Single	check	
2023	Devon Gabriella	"get clean"	Get Clean - Single	check	check
2023	Andrew McMahon In The Wilderness	"Smoke & Ribbons"	Smoke & Ribbons - Single	check	
2023	Kid Bloom	"Afterlife"	Afterlife - Single	check	check
2023	Ari Abdul	"Last Breath"	CCTV	check	check
2023	U-Know Yunho	"Spotlight"	Spotlight - Single	check	check
2023	Alex Porat	"Bar Is On The Floor"		check	check
2023	Indio Ink	"Dume"		check	check
2024	Chelsea Collins	"Congrats, You Lost Me."		check	check
2024	Millie Go Lightly	"Pamela Lee"		check	check
2024	Pixie Lott	"Somebody's Daughter"		check	
2024	Something Corporate, Andrew McMahon in the Wilderness	"Happy"		check	check
2024	Cloudy June	"Big Girls Don’t Cry"		check	
2024	Wafia	"Distant"		check	check
2025	Sabrina Sterling	"Lonely in Love"		check	
2025	Selena Gomez	"Stained"		check	check
