= Stereo Hearts =

2011 single by Gym Class Heroes

Single by Gym Class Heroes featuring Adam Levine

from the album The Papercut Chronicles II
- Released: June 14, 2011
- Recorded: 2011
- Genre: Hip hop; pop rap; rap rock
- Length: 3:31
- Label: Decaydance; Fueled by Ramen
- Songwriters: Travie McCoy; Adam Levine; Benjamin Levin; Sterling Fox; Ammar Malik; Dan Omelio
- Producers: Benny Blanco; Robopop

Gym Class Heroes singles chronology
"Guilty as Charged" (2008)	"Stereo Hearts" (2011)	"Ass Back Home" (2011)

Adam Levine singles chronology
"Bang Bang" (2010)	"Stereo Hearts" (2011)	"Heavy" (2012)

Music video
- "Stereo Hearts" on YouTube

"Stereo Hearts" is a song by American rap rock group Gym Class Heroes featuring Maroon 5 frontman Adam Levine. The song was released on June 14, 2011, as the lead single from the group's fifth studio album The Papercut Chronicles II (2011). The song topped the Billboard Mainstream Top 40 and also reached number four on the Hot 100.

== Composition and recording ==
Produced by Benny Blanco and Robopop, "Stereo Hearts" begins with Adam Levine singing the hook. "My heart's a stereo / It beats for you, so listen close / Hear my thoughts in every note. / Make me your radio / Turn me up when you feel low / This melody was meant for you / So sing along to my stereo." The Sheet music for this song shows the key of A major. McCoy then raps about serenading his ideal girl and picking love over animosity, all the while relaying the message using music-based metaphors. Additional Fender Rhodes was played by Austin Bis at Chalice Recording Studios in Los Angeles.

== Music video ==
Gym Class Heroes drummer Matt McGinley explained that the song's music video "basically plays on the idea that we're sort of just being casual, hanging out, being ourselves and our shadows get wild and get loose. The video shows the band playing in the city of New York and their shadows are playing on the ground."

The video (directed by Hiro Murai) has the feel of a 1980s setting, with a breakdancer and several payphones seen, though the actual setting is modern as evidenced by the Mini Cooper in one scene. It prominently features a pawn shop with a stack of old-fashioned boomboxes and TV sets, on which Adam Levine appears when he is singing the chorus.

In October 2025, the video has hit 1 billion views making it the fourth-most viewed video on Fueled By Ramen.

=== Lyric video ===
A lyric video for the song received millions of views in the first month of its release. This is one of the first lyric videos to incorporate a live action story line, showing a man and a woman in split-screen as they get dressed for the day and go outdoors carrying boom-boxes, until they finally meet in a park. The video stars actress Breana McDow and was directed by music video director Djay Brawner.

== Critical reception ==
The song received positive reviews. MTV's Jenna Hally Rubenstein complimented the band's new direction on "Stereo Hearts", writing that it is "a little more slickly produced than we're used to, but, we're still solidly behind the experimental new song." MTV's James Montgomery described it as a "prime-time slab of genre-mashing, sweat-inducing pop, the kind of song that may very well push GCH to summertime superstardom." Becky Bain of Idolator called it a "head-nodding jam" and "an instantly memorable signal that Gym Class is back in session."

== Live performances ==
Travie McCoy joined Maroon 5 onstage to perform "Stereo Hearts" on Saturday Night Live on November 5, 2011. Gym Class Heroes and Adam Levine performed the song at the 2011 American Music Awards, along with Christina Aguilera for the Maroon 5 song "Moves like Jagger" on November 20, 2011. The duo continued with the song on The Ellen DeGeneres Show on November 23, 2011, and Pepsi Super Bowl Fan Jam, a pre-show of the Super Bowl XLVI on February 2, 2012. On November 19, 2025, McCoy made his special appearance on Maroon 5's Love Is Like Tour, at Madison Square Garden to perform the song.

== Track listing ==
- Digital download
1. "Stereo Hearts (feat. Adam Levine)" – 3:31
- German CD single
1. "Stereo Hearts (feat. Adam Levine)" – 3:31
2. "Stereo Hearts (feat. Adam Levine)" – Soul Seekers Retronica Extended Mix – 6:17
- Remixes
1. "Stereo Hearts (feat. Adam Levine)" – Dillon Francis Radio Edit — 3:36
2. "Stereo Hearts (feat. Adam Levine)" – Soul Seekerz Retronica Radio Edit — 3:36
3. "Stereo Hearts (feat. Adam Levine)" – Dillon Francis Extended Mix — 3:46
4. "Stereo Hearts (feat. Adam Levine)" – Soul Seekerz Retronica Extended Mix — 6:17

== Charts ==
=== Weekly charts ===
Weekly chart performance for "Stereo Hearts"
Chart (2011–2012)	Peak position
Australia (ARIA)	4
Austria (Ö3 Austria Top 40)	28
Belgium (Ultratip Bubbling Under Flanders)	4
Belgium (Ultratop 50 Wallonia)	35
Canada Hot 100 (Billboard)	7
Czech Republic Airplay (ČNS IFPI)	28
Denmark (Tracklisten)	16
Finland (Suomen virallinen lista)	16
France (SNEP)	19
Hungary (Rádiós Top 40)	3
Ireland (IRMA)	4
Israel International Airplay (Media Forest)	1
Italy (FIMI)	12
Japan Hot 100 (Billboard)	35
Netherlands (Dutch Top 40)	8
Netherlands (Single Top 100)	26
New Zealand (Recorded Music NZ)	3
Norway (VG-lista)	4
Romania (Romanian Top 100)	47
Russia Airplay (TopHit)	9
Scottish Singles Sales (Official Charts)	2
Spain (Promusicae)	11
Sweden (Sverigetopplistan)	6
Switzerland (Schweizer Hitparade)	28
UK Hip Hop/R&B (Official Charts)	1
UK Singles (Official Charts)	3
Ukraine Airplay (TopHit)	5
US Billboard Hot 100	4
US Adult Pop Airplay (Billboard)	7
US Dance Airplay (Billboard)	9
US Hot Latin Songs (Billboard)	50
US Pop Airplay (Billboard)	1
US Rhythmic Airplay (Billboard)	7

Chart (2021)	Peak position
India International Singles (IMI)	11

=== Year-end charts ===
Annual chart rankings for "Stereo Hearts"
Chart (2011)	Position
Australia (ARIA)	29
Brazil (Crowley)	89
Canada (Canadian Hot 100)	54
Hungary (Rádiós Top 40)	34
Italy (Musica e dischi)	72
Netherlands (Dutch Top 40)	36
New Zealand (RIANZ)	26
Russia Airplay (TopHit)	148
Sweden (Sverigetopplistan)	44
UK Singles (Official Charts Company)	85
Ukraine Airplay (TopHit)	189
US Billboard Hot 100	36
US Mainstream Top 40 (Billboard)	17

Chart (2012)	Position
Brazil (Crowley)	59
Canada (Canadian Hot 100)	44
Hungary (Rádiós Top 40)	90
Russia Airplay (TopHit)	57
Ukraine Airplay (TopHit)	68
US Billboard Hot 100	61
US Adult Top 40 (Billboard)	35
US Mainstream Top 40 (Billboard)	42

=== All-time charts ===
All-time chart rankings for "Stereo Hearts"
Chart	Position
US Billboard Pop Songs (1992–2017)	56

== Certifications ==
Certifications and sales for "Stereo Hearts"
Region	Certification	Certified units/sales
Australia (ARIA)	3× Platinum	210,000^{^}
Canada (Music Canada)	3× Platinum	240,000^{*}
Italy (FIMI)	Platinum	70,000^{‡}
Mexico (AMPROFON)	Gold	30,000^{*}
New Zealand (RMNZ)	5× Platinum	150,000^{‡}
Spain (Promusicae)	Platinum	60,000^{‡}
Sweden (GLF)	2× Platinum	80,000^{‡}
United Kingdom (BPI)	2× Platinum	1,200,000^{‡}
United States (RIAA)	5× Platinum	5,000,000^{‡}
Streaming
Denmark (IFPI Danmark)	Platinum	100,000^{†}
^{*} Sales figures based on certification alone.^{^} Shipments figures based on certification alone.^{‡} Sales+streaming figures based on certification alone.^{†} Streaming-only figures based on certification alone.

== Release history ==
Release dates and formats for "Stereo Hearts"
Region	Date	Format	Label(s)	Ref.
United States	June 14, 2011	Mainstream airplay	Fueled by Ramen	
