= We'll Be Alright =

2010 single by Travie McCoy

Single by Travie McCoy

from the album Lazarus
- Released: October 18, 2010
- Recorded: 2010
- Genre: Pop
- Length: 3:17
- Label: Fueled by Ramen
- Songwriter(s): Rob Coombes; Danny Goffey; Philip Lawrence; Bruno Mars; Mick Quinn; the Stereotypes
- Producer(s): The Smeezingtons; The Stereotypes

Travie McCoy singles chronology
"Need You" (2010)	"We'll Be Alright" (2010)	"Higher" (2010)

"We'll Be Alright" is a song by Travie McCoy, released as the third single from his debut solo album, Lazarus. The song was produced by the Smeezingtons and Stereotypes and written by Rob Coombes, Danny Goffey, Philip Lawrence, Bruno Mars, Mick Quinn, Jonathan Yip, Ray Romulus and Jeremy Reeves. The song interpolates the 1995 song "Alright" by British alternative rock group Supergrass. The song has charted at number 14 in New Zealand. A second music video features scenes from the film Prom.

== In popular culture ==
The song was featured in the Disney film Prom and appears on its soundtrack. It was also used in a few trailers of Yogi Bear. The song was further featured in season 1 episode 22 of Hawaii Five-0, in the third episode of Love Bites, and in season 2 episode 8 of Royal Pains. The Chipmunks and the Chipettes covered the song as an exclusive iTunes bonus track on the Deluxe Digital Edition of the Alvin and the Chipmunks: Chipwrecked: Music from the Motion Picture O.S.T. A few lyrics were changed in this version.

== Credits and personnel ==
- Lead vocals – Travie McCoy
- Producers – the Smeezingtons, Stereotypes
- Writer(s) – Supergrass, Jonathan Yip, Jeremy Reeves, Bruno Mars, Philip Lawrence, Ray Romulus
- Label: Fueled by Ramen

== Charts ==
Chart performance for "We'll Be Alright"
Chart (2010)	Peak position
Australia (ARIA)	51
Belgium (Ultratip Bubbling Under Flanders)	6
Belgium (Ultratip Bubbling Under Wallonia)	9
Hungary (Rádiós Top 40)	26
Israel (Media Forest)	4
Netherlands (Dutch Top 40)	22
Netherlands (Single Top 100)	82
New Zealand (Recorded Music NZ)	14
UK Singles (OCC)	193

== Certifications ==
Certifications for "We'll Be Alright"
Region	Certification	Certified units/sales
New Zealand (RMNZ)	Gold	7,500^{*}
^{*} Sales figures based on certification alone.

== Release history ==
Release history and formats for "We'll Be Alright"
Country	Date	Format	Label
Australia	October 18, 2010	Digital download	Atlantic
Belgium	October 18, 2010	Digital download	Atlantic
Netherlands	October 18, 2010	Digital download	Atlantic
New Zealand	October 18, 2010	Digital download	Atlantic
United States	January 25, 2011	Radio	Atlantic
