= Golden (Travie McCoy song) =

Single by Travie McCoy featuring Sia
- Released: 15 June 2015
- Genre: Alternative hip hop; electrohop
- Length: 3:35
- Label: Fueled by Ramen; Warner Music Group
- Songwriters: Travis McCoy; Sia Furler; Thomas Pentz; Maxime Picard; Clément Picard
- Producers: Picard Brothers; Diplo

Travie McCoy singles chronology
"Wrapped Up" (2014)	"Golden" (2015)	"Call Me Sir" (2018)

Sia singles chronology
"Déjà Vu" (2015)	"Golden" (2015)	"Fire Meet Gasoline" (2015)

Music video
- "Golden" on YouTube

"Golden" is a song by the American rapper Travie McCoy featuring the Australian singer-songwriter Sia. It was released digitally as a single on June 15, 2015, by Fueled by Ramen.

In an interview with Entertainment Weekly, McCoy said, "I think 'Golden' is a cog in the machine that is the next album. Every song has its own shape and sound in order to make the machine move and work the way I want it to."

== Background ==
In an interview with Entertainment Weekly online, McCoy said he had met Sia four years before and that he had been a fan of hers for years. "When we finally [met] we were totally kindred spirits. We had both gone through a lot and she became a sister to me very quickly. [...] This was probably the third of about three or four that we've recorded together. Who knows if the others will ever be heard, but they all mean so much to me. She actually wrote a song for me when I was going through some really hard times that I will always hold dear to my heart. She's an angel with the voice of one." Speaking on Entertainment Tonight, McCoy said, "It's like second nature working with Sia. We have this brotherly-sisterly vibe going on. Once I heard the hook, I kinda knew where I wanted to go lyrically and I wrote it in about 45 minutes... I think a lot of people can relate to having those tinglies in their stomach about that special somebody."

== Music video ==
The video for "Golden" was premiered on YouTube on 14 June 2015 and is inspired by an iconic traffic shot in Jean-Luc Godard's 1967 cult classic film Week-end. The video is a continuous looping shot of Travie leaving his car on a desert road and observing the eccentric passengers in the vehicles in front of him.

== Charts ==
=== Weekly charts ===
Chart (2015)	Peak position
Australia (ARIA)	4
Australia Urban (ARIA)	2
Belgium (Ultratip Bubbling Under Flanders)	74
New Zealand (Recorded Music NZ)	20
Slovakia Airplay (ČNS IFPI)	71
Slovakia Singles Digital (ČNS IFPI)	69

== Certifications ==
Region	Certification	Certified units/sales
Australia (ARIA)	Platinum	70,000^{‡}
New Zealand (RMNZ)	Gold	7,500^{*}
^{*} Sales figures based on certification alone.^{‡} Sales+streaming figures based on certification alone.

== Release history ==
Country	Date	Format	Label
United States	June 15, 2015	Digital download	Fueled by Ramen
Australia	June 15, 2015	Digital download	Warner Music Australia
