= The Papercut Chronicles =

Studio album by Gym Class Heroes
- Released: February 22, 2005
- Recorded: Watchman Studios, Lockport, New York
- Genres: Alternative rock; alternative hip hop; rap rock; jazz rock
- Length: 57:37
- Label: Decaydance/Fueled by Ramen
- Producer: Doug White

Gym Class Heroes chronology
...For the Kids (2001)	The Papercut Chronicles (2005)	As Cruel as School Children (2006)

Singles from The Papercut Chronicles
- 1. "Taxi Driver" Released: 2004; 2. "Papercuts" Released: 2005

The Papercut Chronicles is the second studio album by rap rock group Gym Class Heroes. It was the band's first album on a label, released by Decaydance/Fueled by Ramen on February 22, 2005. The album reached No. 19 on Billboard's Top Internet Albums Sales chart.

The album includes the original version of "Cupid's Chokehold." The band included another version on their 2006 album As Cruel as Schoolchildren, and it became a major hit in 2007. A sequel, The Papercut Chronicles II, was released in 2011.

== Background ==
Gym Class Heroes formed in 1997, in Geneva, New York, after lead vocalist Travie "Schleprock" McCoy and drummer Matt McGinley met in high school gym class. Initially influenced by rock bands such as Rage Against the Machine, the group developed a sound that combined hip-hop, jazz fusion, and alternative rock.

After they began touring in 2004, including performances on the Vans Warped Tour, they began recording an album. Before the album was complete, they attracted the attention of Fall Out Boy bassist Pete Wentz. Wentz helped the band secure a deal with Fueled by Ramen and signed them to Decaydance imprint, which led to the release of The Paper Chronicles in 2005.

== Music and lyrics ==
The Papercut Chronicles combines hip-hop vocals with live instrumentation and draws on a range of musical styles. The lyrics address pop culture, personal relationships and struggles. In 2008, McCoy told Spin magazine: "That record covers my entire life for two years, from the relationships with drunk girls to the death of my cousin to my mom's alcoholism to drug addiction."

The song "Papercuts" reveals McCoy's feelings about his mother's absence, while "Simple Livin'" reflects on the challenges of working multiple jobs to make ends meet. "The Makeout Club" takes a humorous approach to past relationships, while "Everyday's Forecast" explores confusion and frustration. "Faces in the Hall" confronts homophobia, and "Taxi Driver" is a lighter song that references several emo and indie rock bands including Sunny Day Real Estate, Death Cab for Cutie, Dashboard Confessional, and Jets to Brazil. The song also references pills, a recurring theme across several tracks, particularly "Pillmatic," which is dedicated to prescription pill abuse.

"Cupid Chokehold," an unabashed love song, was co-produced by labelmate Patrick Stump of Fall Out Boy. The song borrows the melody and chorus form Supertramp's 1979 song "Breakfast in America." The band could not clear the sample so Stump sang the chorus.

== Release and reception ==
Professional ratings
Review scores
Source	Rating
Hectic Eclectic	link

The Papercut Chronicles was released on February 22, 2005. The album reached No. 19 on Billboard's Top Internet Albums Sales chart o March 12, 2005. By January 2007, it had sold 58,000 units according to Nielsen SoundScan.

The song "Cupid's Chokehold" began receiving radio airplay in 2006, prompting the band to release another version on their follow-up album As Cruel as School Children. That version peaked at No. 4 on Billboard's Hot 100 chart in 2007.

The album received positive reviews with critics highlighting McCoy's storytelling and the band's use of live instrumentation. Ron Gonzales of the Albuquerque Journal wrote that "Schleprock serves up a deft lyrical style while his bandmates weave sometimes eerie musical backdrops."

Mabel Suen of The Current commended the group for "creating a new breed of hip-hop that puts much of what is popular nowadays to shame, the four-piece ensemble from New York utilizes reality as its weapon of choice—real music with real instruments and messages. Witty pop culture references and intelligent ideas blow audiences' minds and force them to think twice." She concluded that the "cleverly engineered lyrical concoctions of front man 'Schleprok' lead a skillful collaboration that triumphs man over machine's programmed beats."

Fall Out Boy's Patrick Stump praised the album, saying, "Papercut is so heavy and honest. There's no front, which is why emo kids relate to it."

== Track listing ==
=== Standard Edition ===
1. "Za Intro" – 1:40
2. "Papercuts" – 3:26
3. "Petrified Life and the Twice Told Joke (Decrepit Bricks)" – 4:53
4. "Make Out Club" – 4:43
5. "Taxi Driver" – 1:59
6. "So Long Friend" – 1:14
7. "Everyday's Forecast" – 4:21
8. "Pillmatic" – 3:11
9. "Simple Livin'" – 3:06
10. "Cupid's Chokehold" (featuring Patrick Stump) – 4:03
11. "Faces in the Hall" – 4:13
12. "Graduation Day" – 1:44
13. "Apollo 3-1-5" – 2:29
14. "Wejusfreestylin'pt2" – 1:12
15. "To Bob Ross with Love" – 2:38
16. "Papercuts (The Reason for the Lesions Remix by Mr. Dibbs)" – 3:46
17. "Kid Nothing vs. the Echo Factor" – 4:01
18. "Band Aids" – 4:58

=== Japanese Bonus Track ===
1. "Boomerang Theory" (Bonus Track)

=== Bonus Remix CD ===
1. "Chicago" (Remix)
2. "Heart Transplant" (Remix)
3. "Attention" (Remix)
4. "Gotta Get Out of Here" (Remix)

== Personnel ==
Credits adapted from album's liner notes.

Gym Class Heroes

- Travis McCoy – vocals
- Matt McGinley – drums
- Ryan Geise – bass
- Disashi Lumumba-Kasongo – guitar

Additional personnel

- Doug White - producer, engineer
- Milo Bonacci - guitars
- Sie One - production (tracks 1, 8, 12, and 18)
- Gary Ventura - photography
- Evan Leake - CD layout/design
- Patrick Stump - guest vocals (track 10)
- Adam English - piano (track 10)
- Rand Bellavia - additional backing vocals (track 10)
- Matt Green - mixing and additional engineering (track 10)
- Mr. Dibbs - remixing (track 16)
- Chris Alsip - guest vocals (track 16)
