= The Papercut Chronicles II =

Studio album by Gym Class Heroes
- Released: November 15, 2011
- Recorded: 2009–2011
- Genres: Pop rap; alternative hip-hop; rap rock; emo pop; alternative rock
- Length: 43:29
- Labels: Warner Bros.; Decaydance; Fueled by Ramen
- Producers: Pete Wentz (exec.); Emile; Benny Blanco; Robopop; Noel Zancanella; Ryan Tedder

Gym Class Heroes chronology
The Quilt (2008)	The Papercut Chronicles II (2011)

Singles from The Papercut Chronicles II
- 1. "Stereo Hearts" Released: June 14, 2011; 2. "Life Goes On" Released: October 18, 2011; 3. "Ass Back Home" Released: October 31, 2011; 4. "The Fighter" Released: November 8, 2011; 5. "Martyrial Girls" Released: August 27, 2012

The Papercut Chronicles II is the fifth studio album by American rap rock band Gym Class Heroes. It was released through Decaydance Records, Warner Bros. Records and Fueled by Ramen on November 15, 2011. It serves as a sequel to the group's second studio album, The Papercut Chronicles (2005). The album has sold 88,000 copies in the United States.

== Singles ==
- The album's lead single, "Stereo Hearts" featuring Adam Levine from Maroon 5 was released for download via iTunes on June 14, 2011. It peaked at number 4 on the US Billboard Hot 100 chart.
- The album's second single, "Ass Back Home" featuring Neon Hitch was released for download via iTunes on October 31, 2011.
- The album's third single, "The Fighter" featuring Ryan Tedder of OneRepublic was released on November 8, 2011.
- The album's fourth and final single, "Martyrial Girls" was released on August 27, 2012.

=== Promotional singles ===
- The album's first and only promotional single, "Life Goes On" featuring Oh Land was released for download via iTunes on October 18, 2011.

== Critical reception ==
Professional ratings
Aggregate scores
Source	Rating
Metacritic	53/100
Review scores
Source	Rating
AllMusic	3/5 stars
Artistdirect	5/5 stars
Billboard	4/5 stars
Entertainment Weekly	B
HitFix	B
IGN	7/10
Metromix	3.5/5 stars
Rolling Stone	1.5/5 stars
USA Today	3/4 stars

According to the review aggregator Metacritic, The Papercut Chronicles II received "mixed or average reviews" based on a weighted average score of 53 out of 100 from six critic scores. Kyle Anderson of Entertainment Weekly opined that while the album "too often chokes on revved-up aggro crunch and laughable lyrical raging against the machine, it works when they jettison their limp rap-rock instincts and plunge into crossover pop like the haunting 'Life Goes On' and stealthily sincere 'Ass Back Home'." Gregory Heaney of AllMusic noted that The Papercut Chronicles II will come as a "blast from the past" for the band's fans, adding that songs such as "Lazarus, Ze Gitan" and "Solo Discotheque (Whiskey Bitness)" feature the "infectious and highly polished sound that has made the quartet the pop/rap/punk crossover triple threat that it's grown into over the years." In a highly negative review of the record, Jody Rosen of Rolling Stone gave the record one and a half stars out of five, calling it "the year's most charmless album" and referring to McCoy as a "laughably inept MC".

== Track listing ==
The track listing for all versions of The Papercut Chronicles II is as follows:

No.	Title	Writer(s)	Producer(s)	Length
1.	"Za Intro"	Travis McCoy; Matt McGinley; Disashi Lumumba-Kasongo; Eric Roberts	Sie One	1:33
2.	"Martyrial Girls"	McCoy; McGinley; Lumumba-Kasongo; Roberts	Emile Haynie	3:37
3.	"Life Goes On" (featuring Oh Land)	McCoy; McGinley; Lumumba-Kasongo; Roberts; Emile Haynie; Annie Clark	Emile Haynie	4:12
4.	"Stereo Hearts" (featuring Adam Levine)	McCoy; McGinley; Lumumba-Kasongo; Roberts; Adam Levine; Benjamin Levin; Ammar Malik; Brandon Lowry; Dan Omelio	Benny Blanco; Robopop	3:31
5.	"Solo Discotheque (Whiskey Bitness)"	McCoy; McGinley; Lumumba-Kasongo; Roberts; Tyler Pursel	Gym Class Heroes	4:02
6.	"Holy Horseshit, Batman!!" (featuring Nate Ruess)	McCoy; McGinley; Lumumba-Kasongo; Roberts; Nate Ruess	Emile Haynie	3:41
7.	"Ass Back Home" (featuring Neon Hitch)	McCoy; McGinley; Lumumba-Kasongo; Roberts; Levin; Malik; Omelio; David Silberstein	Benny Blanco; Robopop	3:42
8.	"Nil-Nil-Draw"	McCoy; McGinley; Lumumba-Kasongo; Roberts; Pursel	Emile Haynie	3:15
9.	"Lazarus, Ze Gitan"	McCoy; McGinley; Lumumba-Kasongo; Roberts	Gym Class Heroes	3:51
10.	"The Fighter" (featuring Ryan Tedder)	McCoy; McGinley; Lumumba-Kasongo; Roberts; Ryan Tedder; Noel Zancanella	Ryan Tedder; Noel Zancanella	3:49
11.	"Kid Nothing and the Never-Ending Naked Nightmare"	McCoy; McGinley; Lumumba-Kasongo; Roberts	Emile Haynie	8:23
Total length:				43:29

UK bonus tracks
No.	Title	Writer(s)	Length
12.	"Stereo Hearts" (featuring Adam Levine) (Soul Seekerz Retronica Radio Edit)	McCoy, Lumumba-Kasongo, Roberts, McGinley, Levine, Levin, Lowry, Malik, Omelio	3:36
13.	"Stereo Hearts" (featuring Adam Levine) (Dillon Francis Radio Edit)	McCoy, Lumumba-Kasongo, Roberts, McGinley, Levine, Levin, Lowry, Malik, Omelio	3:36
Total length:			50:41

- The song "Kid Nothing and the Never-Ending Naked Nightmare" itself ends at 3:53. There is then a few minutes of silence, then at 7:07 a hidden track outro starts, which involves a computerized voice asking what the listener thought about the album, then going off into random tangents.

== Personnel ==
Gym Class Heroes

- Travis McCoy – vocals
- Matt McGinley – drums
- Disashi Lumumba-Kasongo – guitar, vocals
- Eric Roberts – bass guitar

Additional musicians

- Jason Amsel – vocals (1)
- Austin Bisnow – Rhodes (4)
- Benny Blanco – additional drums, keyboards, and programming (4, 7)
- Emile Haynie – keyboard and drum programming (2, 3, 6, 8, 11)
- Neon Hitch – vocals (7)
- Adam Levine – vocals (4)
- Ammar Malik – background vocals (4, 7, 10)
- Phillip A. Peterson – strings (3, 4)
- Robopop – additional drums, keyboards, programming, and guitars (4, 7)
- Ryan Tedder – additional instrumentation (10)
- Noel Zancanella – additional instrumentation (10)

Technical personnel

- Benny Blanco – engineer (4, 7), vocal editing (4)
- Smith Carlson – engineer (10)
- Rob Freeman – instrument engineer (2, 3, 6, 8, 11)
- Chris Galland – mixing assistant (2, 3, 6, 8, 11)
- Chris Gehringer – mastering
- Serban Ghenea – mixing (4, 7, 10)
- Mark "Exit" Goodchild – engineer (4)
- John Hanes – mix engineer (4, 7, 10)
- Jimmy James – vocal editing assistant (4), assistant mix engineer (7)
- Jeremy "J Boogs" Levin – production coordination (4, 7)
- Erik Madrid – mixing assistant (2, 3, 6, 8, 11)
- Manny Marroquin – mixing (2, 3, 6, 8, 11)
- Tore Nissen – engineer for Oh Land (3)
- Tim Roberts – assistant mix engineer (4, 10)
- Phil Seaford – assistant mix engineer (7)
- David "D Slib" Silberstein – production coordination (4, 7)
- Ryan Tedder – engineer (10)
- Andrew Wright – vocal engineer (2, 3, 6, 8, 11), engineer (3)
- Scott "Yarmov" Yarmovsky – assistant mix engineer (7)

== Charts ==
Chart (2011–2012)	Peak position
UK Albums (Official Charts)	95
UK R&B Albums (Official Charts)	10
US Billboard 200	54
US Top Rap Albums (Billboard)	10

Chart (2023)	Peak position
Hungarian Physical Albums (MAHASZ)	30

== Release history ==
Region	Date	Format	Label
United States	November 15, 2011	CD, digital download	Fueled by Ramen
United Kingdom	February 27, 2012	CD, digital download	Fueled by Ramen, Atlantic Records
