= Gym Class Heroes =

American rap rock band

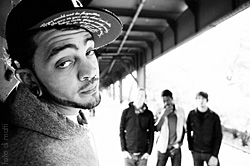
- Gym Class Heroes in Berlin, 2008

Background information
- Origin: Geneva, New York, U.S.
- Genres: Alternative hip-hop; pop rap; rap rock; R&B; funk
- Years active: 1997–2012; 2018–2019; 2023–present
- Labels: Decaydance; Fueled by Ramen; Atlantic; BatSquad
- Members: Travie McCoy
- Past members: Matt McGinley; Ryan Geise; Milo Bonacci; Steve Decker; Jason Amsel; Eric Roberts; Disashi Lumumba-Kasongo; Ralfy Valencia; Joey Guise

Gym Class Heroes is an American rap rock band from Geneva, New York. The group formed in 1997 when Travie McCoy met drummer Matt McGinley during their high school gym class. The band's music displays a wide variety of influences, including hip hop, rock, funk, and reggae.

Gym Class Heroes released their debut album independently, and after the addition of guitarist Disashi Lumumba-Kasongo and bassist Eric Roberts, they signed to Fall Out Boy bassist Pete Wentz's Decaydance Records, an imprint of Fueled by Ramen, and released the album The Papercut Chronicles (2005). The group gained a strong fanbase while promoting the album, appearing at festivals such as The Bamboozle and Vans Warped Tour.

In 2006, the group released the gold-selling album As Cruel as School Children. They crossed over into mainstream with the single "Cupid's Chokehold," which peaked at No. 4 on the Billboard Hot 100, and reached the top ten of the charts in various countries. Their next single "Clothes Off!!" also peaked within the top ten of the charts in the United Kingdom. In 2007, they won the MTV Video Music Award for Best New Artist.

In 2008, Gym Class Heroes released their third album, The Quilt, and then they went on hiatus in 2009, a time in which the members pursued various side projects. McCoy released his solo debut album Lazarus in 2010. Lumumba-Kasongo has been working on his side-project Soul, while McGinley now drums in the rock group Kill the Frontman. The group released The Papercut Chronicles II in 2011; its lead single, "Stereo Hearts", peaked at No. 4 on the Billboard Hot 100. Gym Class Heroes were inducted into the Rochester Music Hall of Fame in 2025.

== History ==
=== 1997–2004: Formation and career beginnings ===
Rapper Travie McCoy and drummer Matt McGinley became friends at their local high school in ninth grade in Geneva, New York. They officially came together in 1997. The band formed when bassist Ryan Geise and drummer Matt McGinley were performing at a party in an instrumental band with no vocals. McCoy, who was in attendance at the party, took the microphone onstage and started rapping. A week later, the group came together and started making music.

The group began playing college parties, local events, nightclubs, and festivals which eventually led to larger venues throughout the northeast. In 2001, the group independently released the album …For the Kids. In 2002, McCoy won MTV's Direct Effect MC Battle and as a prize.

=== 2004–2005: Signing to Decaydance and The Papercut Chronicles ===
Gym Class Heroes began recording their debut album independently and organized their first tour without assistance. During the tour in 2004, a friend approached them about designing T-shirts and received a CD of several songs to inspire his work. The designer, who knew Fall Out Boy bassist Pete Wentz, played the recordings for him. Wentz subsequently traveled to Buffalo with his bandmate Patrick Stump to meet the group. Wentz worked with John Janick to sign Gym Class Heroes as the first act associated with Decaydance Records, Wentz's imprint at Fueled by Ramen.

By the end of the year, guitarist Milo Bonacci (who went on to form Ra Ra Riot) parted ways with the band and was replaced with guitarist Disashi Lumumba-Kasongo (brother of the rapper Sammus), who was attending Cornell University at the time. On the first day the band began to rehearse with Lumumba-Kasongo, "Cupid's Chokehold" was written, which would become the album's first single. McGinley recalled, "We just had intentions of working him in on old songs, but we ended up jamming on this Supertramp thing for a minute and got carried away and wrote a song." The group released the four-song Papercut Chronicles EP before finally releasing The Papercut Chronicles on February 22, 2005.

After Eric Roberts replaced Ryan Geise on bass, the group toured extensively in 2005 and performed at festivals including SXSW, The Bamboozle, and Warped Tour. They also opened for Fall Out Boy, reggae band John Brown's Body, and rapper Lloyd Banks of G-Unit. The band's genre-blending sound initially confused audiences, but McCoy said that crowds often warmed to their performances after a few songs. The group also struggled to find a place on radio. Wentz recalled that alternative stations considered them hip-hop, while pop and hip-hop stations were unsure how to categorize a live band.

During this period, McCoy used the stage name Schleprock but as the band achieved mainstream success he transitioned away from the moniker to perform under his real name Travis "Travie" McCoy.

=== 2006–2007: As Cruel as School Children ===
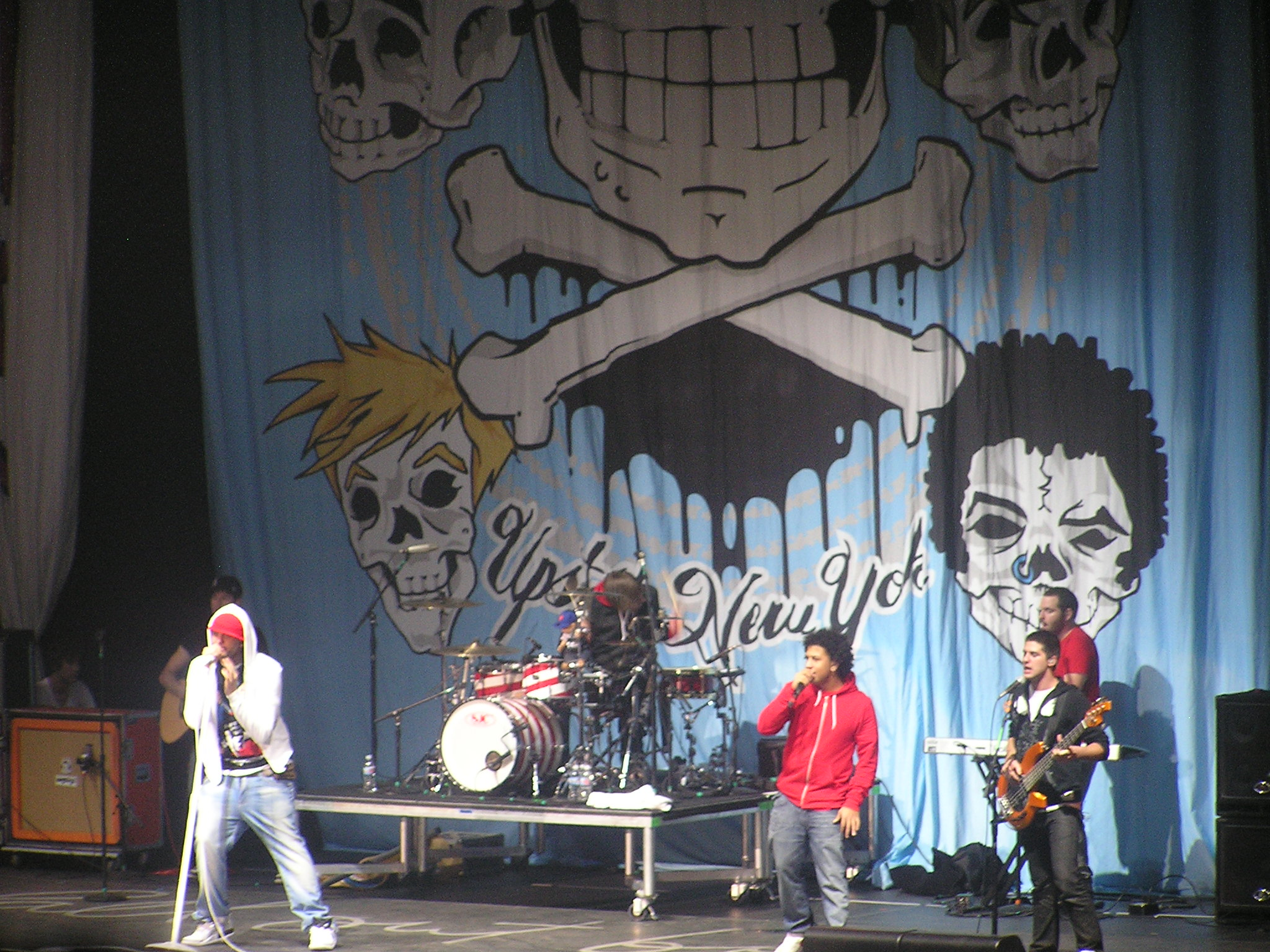
Gym Class Heroes performing at the San Diego Sports Arena on December 1, 2007

In May 2006, WXSS, a radio station in Milwaukee, began playing "Cupid's Chokehold." The group's manager, Scott Nagelberg recalled, "As more stations added it, it became undeniable: This was the chance for this band to make it happen." Although the band intended to promote "The Queen and I" as the album's lead single, the label shifted its focus to "Cupid's Chokehold." The group became frustrated with its association with the song after their scheduled performance of "The Queen and I" on Jimmy Kimmel Live! was changed to "Cupid's Chokehold" last minute. However, McGinley later stated, "Eventually, we saw the rationale. It's a little awkward, but it's still Gym Class Heroes. At the end of the day, it's a good song we all believe in, so we're happy it's getting a lot of attention." It became the band's most successful single, peaking at No. 4 on the Billboard Hot 100.

The band also gained further popularity when McCoy was featured in the Cobra Starship song "Snakes on a Plane (Bring It)", which was featured on the soundtrack to the film.

In July 2006, Gym Class Heroes released As Cruel as School Children. The record contained guest appearances by Patrick Stump of Fall Out Boy and William Beckett from The Academy Is.... The album marked a departure in the band's sound, with the band utilizing drum machines and synthesizers as opposed to the band's typical live instrumentation. By January 2007, it had sold 98,000 units in the United States, 40,000 more than its 2005 predecessor The Papercut Chronicles, according to Nielsen SoundScan. The band attributed its success to internet promotion and touring, building a dedicated fanbase through live performances.

Their next single "Clothes Off!!" peaked at No. 46 on the Billboard Hot 100 in 2007. In Europe, it reached the top ten of the charts in Finland, the Republic of Ireland, and the United Kingdom. Gym Class Heroes won the fan-voted Best New Artist award at the 2007 MTV Video Music Awards.

=== 2008: The Quilt ===
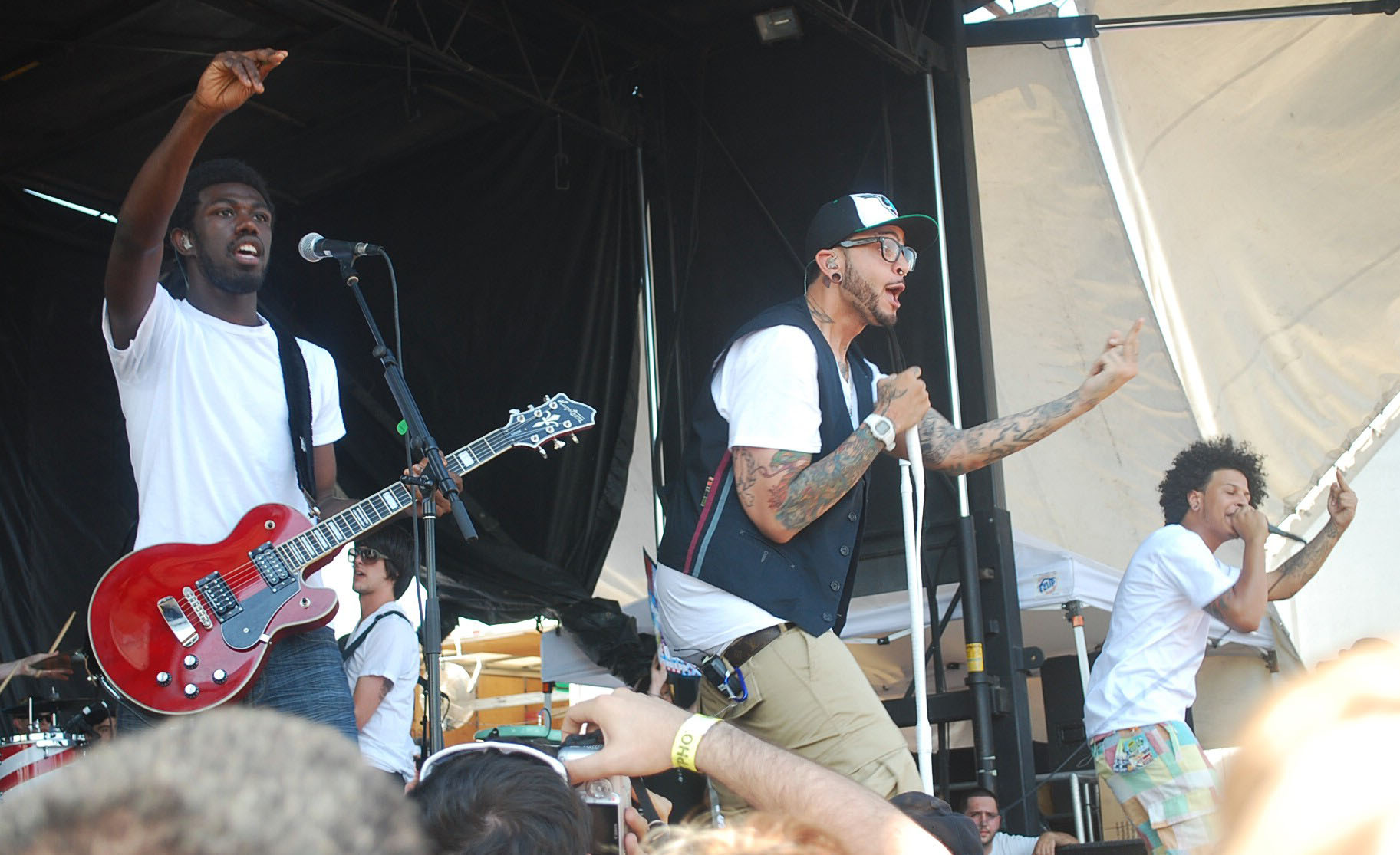
Gym Class Heroes performing at Warped Tour on June 20, 2008

After headlining a seven-week U.S. tour called the "Daryl Hall for President Tour '07", the group returned to the studio to record new material. Their single "Cookie Jar" featuring The Dream peaked at No. 59 on the Billboard Hot 100 and No. 6 on the UK Singles Chart.

Gym Class Heroes co-headlined the 2008 Warped Tour along with Fueled by Ramen label mates Paramore. While the band was performing onstage in St. Louis on July 2, 2008, McCoy was arrested after hitting a man from the crowd who had shouted racial slurs at him.

Their album The Quilt, which was released on September 9, 2008. It featured numerous collaborations with several artists, including Daryl Hall of Hall & Oates, The-Dream, Estelle, and Busta Rhymes. Guitarist Disashi Lumumba-Kasongo said of the album:

"I would definitely say that this is the most collaborative album I've played on with the band. I remember the very first day we started jamming out and working on the songs. I thought, Man, I haven't felt like this since I was in high school jamming out in a garage. So it's kind of cool, 'cause it was that same feeling, except we were recording for a major album."

Gym Class Heroes and the Roots co-headlined a one-month US tour beginning in October 2008.

=== 2009–2011: Side projects ===
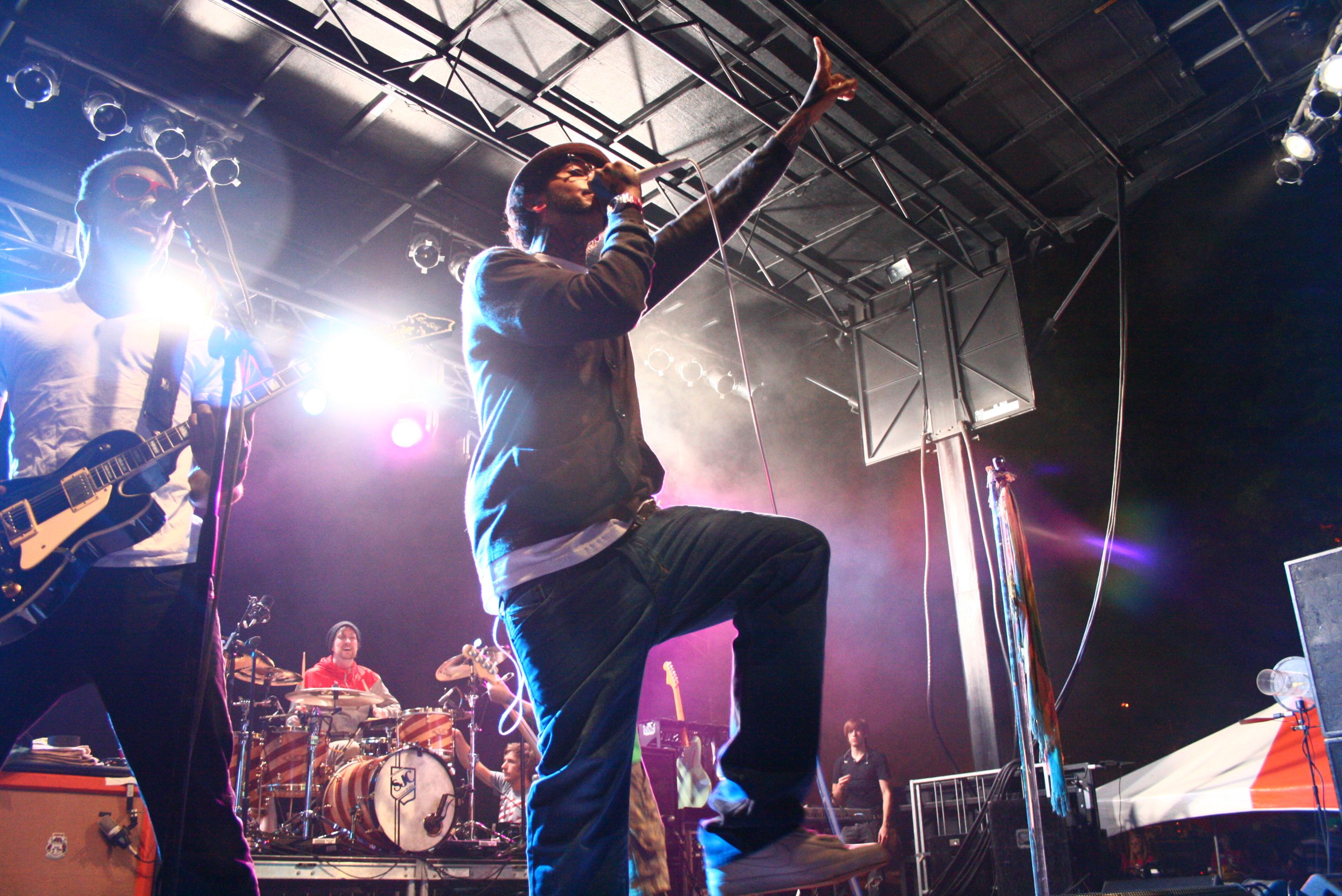
Gym Class Heroes performing at the University of Tennessee on April 24, 2009

In 2010, McCoy pursued a solo career and released the hit single "Billionaire" with Bruno Mars from his debut solo album, Lazarus. Lumumba-Kasongo created the side-project Soul in 2008, which he has currently been focusing on during Gym Class Heroes' break. The songs "Live a Little" and "No Place Left to Run" from The Quilt were originally intended to be used strictly for his side project, but McCoy heard the songs and convinced Lumumba-Kasongo to let Gym Class Heroes use the songs. McGinley has been drumming in the rock group Kill the Frontman.

=== 2011–2019: The Papercut Chronicles II and hiatus ===
McCoy had discussed the band's new album, The Papercut Chronicles II, "We're about 12 demos deep. All I got to say is it's definitely going back to the essence of Gym Class Heroes, which is four dudes sitting in a room, vibing off each other and making organic, dark metal." On June 9, 2011, Gym Class Heroes released a song entitled "Stereo Hearts" which features Adam Levine from Maroon 5. It was the first single to be released from The Papercut Chronicles II. It became available for download on iTunes on June 14, 2011. It peaked at No. 4 on the Billboard Hot 100. On October 18, 2011, Gym Class Heroes released a song entitled "Life Goes On" which features Oh Land. It is the first and only promotional single to be released from The Papercut Chronicles II. On October 31, the band released their second single of the album, "Ass Back Home", featuring Neon Hitch via iTunes. The third single "The Fighter" features Ryan Tedder from OneRepublic and was released on November 8, 2011, one week before the album's release on November 15. On November 20, 2011, Gym Class Heroes performed "Stereo Hearts" with Adam Levine on the American Music Awards of 2011. The video for the fourth single, "Martyrial Girls", premiered on Fueled by Ramen's YouTube channel on August 27, 2012. Following the release of the single, the group ceased activity and entered a hiatus.

In 2018, the band returned to playing live, opening for 311 and The Offspring on their Never Ending Summer Tour. They were set to perform on the Vans Warped Tour 25th Anniversary Show in Atlantic City before abruptly breaking up again. In 2019, McCoy stated in an interview that Gym Class Heroes was still on a hiatus, with an uncertain duration.

=== 2023–present: Reunion performances and Upcoming sixth album ===
On October 11, 2022, When We Were Young Festival announced the band as part of the line-up for the 2023 edition of the festival. In April 2023, the band was announced to be touring with All Time Low, for the latter's The Sound of Letting Go on Tour.

In April 2025, Gym Class Heroes were inducted into the Rochester Music Hall of Fame.

On July 10, 2026, they released a new single titled "Universal Language," their first new song in 14 to 15 years since The Papercut Chronicles II and the song serves as the lead single to their upcoming sixth album. The group embarked on the North American Back To Basics Tour with Lupe Fiasco and B.o.B in the fall of 2026.

== Musical style and influences ==
AllMusic described Gym Class Heroes as a "unique alternative-funk-rap outfit" and also stated that their sounds melds elements of rap, rock, R&B, and funk into one cohesive and melodic sound. Their sound has also been described as a mix of alternative hip hop and pop-rap. Glenn Gamboa of Newsday wrote, "Imagine OutKast as a live band or The Roots steeped in indie rock and you get close to the Gym Class Heroes sound."

Lead vocalist Travie McCoy said of the band's musical style, "We've been the proverbial sore thumb our entire career. Even before we got signed to Fueled by Ramen, we were playing shows with death metal and hardcore bands and whoever would let us play with them. I wouldn't even consider us a hip-hop band. Musically, it's just all over the place." In the beginning, they were influenced by rock bands such as Rage Against the Machine but their sound evolved to blend genres. Drummer Matt McGinley recalled that seeing the Black Eyed Peas perform helped them recognize the musical direction they wanted to pursue.

The band acknowledges '80s funk-influenced R&B acts such as Prince and Ready for the World as influences on its sound. Each member draws from different types of music for inspiration, with McGinley saying "there aren't many [types of music] we agree on." McCoy cited blue-eyed soul group Hall & Oates as his biggest musical influence. Guitarist Disashi Lumumba-Kasango was mainly influenced by rock music, citing Jimi Hendrix and Muse as an inspiration for his guitar playing. Bassist Eric Roberts incorporated elements of reggae into his playing, as well as styles influenced by metal bands such as The Dillinger Escape Plan and Meshuggah. McGinley favors funk and rock stylistics inspired by groups such as Green Day, Red Hot Chili Peppers, and 311.

Initially, the band was noted for not using samples in its music, a practice commonly used in hip-hop. McCoy stated that "It's more fun and organic in the live show. There's definitely a lot of acts that can pull off a DJ/MC thing but then a lot that can't. Also I guess it's all we know." McGinley commented, "We've always been a band and we never did sampling at all before but within the last couple of years we've embraced it more. In the songs we did with Patrick Stump we used it."

== Band members ==
=== Current members ===
- Travie McCoy – lead vocals (1997–2013, 2018–2019, 2023–present)

=== Former members ===
- Matt McGinley – drums, percussion (1997–2013, 2018–2019, 2023)
- Ryan Geise – bass (1997–2005)
- Milo Bonacci – guitar, vocals (1997–2004)
- Steve Decker – sampler (1997–2003)
- Jason Amsel – guitar (2000–2001)
- Disashi Lumumba-Kasongo – guitar, backing vocals (2004–2013, 2018–2019, 2023)
- Eric Roberts – bass, backing vocals (2005–2013, 2018)
- Ralfy Valencia – bass (2018–2019)

=== Current touring members ===
- Tyler Pursel – keyboards, rhythm guitar, backing vocals (2006–2013, 2018–2019, 2023–present)
- Mike Benj – drums (2025–present)
- Nico Aranda – bass (2026)

=== Former touring members ===
- Marc DeJesus – hype man (2006–2013)
- Joseph Veazie – hype man, clean vocals (2018–2019)
- Ledaris "LJ" Jones – bass, synthesizer (2025)

== Discography ==
- …For the Kids (2001)
- The Papercut Chronicles (2005)
- As Cruel as School Children (2006)
- The Quilt (2008)
- The Papercut Chronicles II (2011)

== Awards and nominations ==
Year	Award	Category	Result
2007	MTV Video Music Awards	Best Group	Nominated
2007	MTV Video Music Awards	Best New Artist	Won
2007	MTV European Music Awards	Ultimate Urban	Nominated
2012	MuchMusic Video Awards	International Video of the Year - Group (Stereo Hearts)	Nominated
2012	MuchMusic Video Awards	Most Streamed Video of the Year (Stereo Hearts)	Nominated
2012	Teen Choice Awards	Choice Music: Group	Nominated
2012	Teen Choice Awards	Choice Music Single by a Group (Ass Back Home)	Nominated
2012	Teen Choice Awards	Choice Summer Music Star Group	Nominated
2012	MTV Video Music Awards	Best Video with a Message (The Fighter)	Nominated
