= Travie McCoy =

American rapper (born 1981)

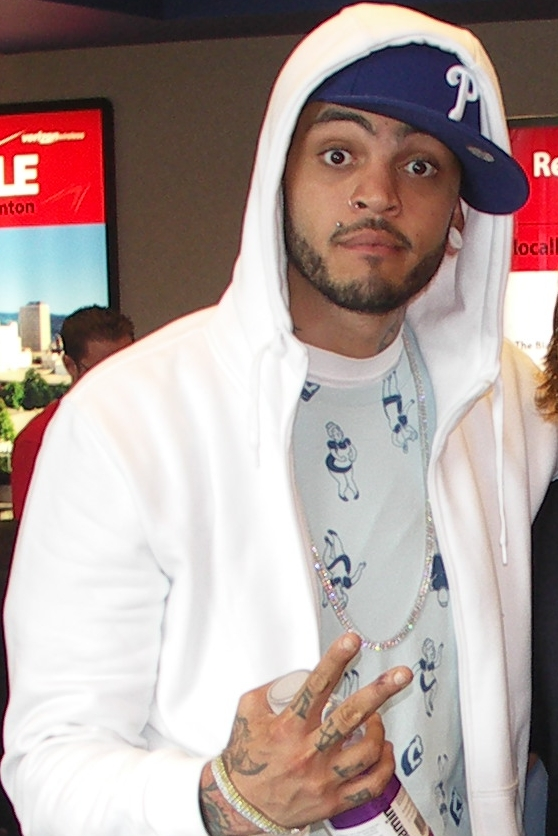
- McCoy in 2007

Background information
- Also known as: Schleprok; Bernie Allen
- Born: Travis Lazarus McCoy; August 5, 1981 (age 45); Geneva, New York, U.S.
- Genres: Alternative hip-hop; pop rap; rap rock
- Occupations: Rapper; singer; songwriter
- Years active: 1997–present
- Labels: Hopeless; Decaydance; Fueled by Ramen; Nappy Boy; Atlantic
- Member of: Gym Class Heroes

Travis "Travie" Lazarus McCoy (born August 5, 1981) is an American rapper, singer, songwriter, and tattoo artist. He is the co-founder and lead vocalist of the rap rock band Gym Class Heroes.

McCoy formed Gym Class Heroes with his classmate Matt McGinley in 1997, after the two became acquainted with the East Coast punk rock scene. Gym Class Heroes recorded independently before signing to Fall Out Boy bassist Pete Wentz's Decaydance Records to release their second album, The Papercut Chronicles (2005). Their third album As Cruel as School Children (2006) spawned the hit singles "Cupid's Chokehold" and "Clothes Off!!," both featuring Fall Out Boy lead singer Patrick Stump. In 2007, McCoy launched the label BatSquad to sign rapper Tyga. After releasing the album The Quilt (2008), Gym Class Heroes took a hiatus, and McCoy shifted focus to his solo work.

McCoy signed with Decaydance in a joint venture with T-Pain's Nappy Boy Entertainment to release his debut studio album, Lazarus (2010). The lead single, "Billionaire" featuring Bruno Mars, peaked at No. 4 on the Billboard Hot 100 and received quadruple platinum certification by the RIAA. In 2011, Gym Class Heroes had a hit single with "Stereo Hearts" featuring Adam Levine. McCoy's 2015 single, "Golden" featuring Sia, was certified platinum by the Australian Recording Industry Association (ARIA). In 2022, McCoy signed with Hopeless Records to release his second solo album, Never Slept Better. Gym Class Heroes were inducted into the Rochester Music Hall of Fame in 2025.

== Early life and education ==
Travis Lazarus McCoy was born and raised in Geneva, New York. His father is Haitian and his mother is of Native American and Irish descent.

Around the fifth grade, McCoy struggled with his weight, which led him to develop his artistic and songwriting talents as a way to attract girls. He recalled writing love letters, drawing pictures, and singing to girls he liked, although their relationships were often kept secret because they didn't want to be seen with him.

As a teenager, McCoy was a fan of hardcore punk bands such as Snapcase and Earth Crisis, as well as underground rap acts such as Company Flow and the Arsonists. He later said, "I was never a typical hip-hop kid. I didn't want to be pigeonholed." McCoy frequently took buses down to Manhattan, New York, throughout high school to participate in battle raps at the indie rap club Fat Beats. McCoy also played the drums in high school and created a rap group with his father and his brother called "True Life Playas." He later recalled, "It was so bad! The tapes exist somewhere but hopefully they'll never be found."

When he was 15, McCoy worked in a tattoo parlor as an apprentice, and shortly after, he began tattooing his friends. He also taught art at a Boys & Girls Club in the daytime, and working at a gas station at night. McCoy decided to quit all three jobs and work on art full-time, putting together an art show with his friend where he sold several paintings.

After graduating from Geneva High School, McCoy attended Munson-Williams-Proctor Arts Institute in Utica, New York and majored in fine arts and illustration. He dropped out of school at age 20 to focus on his tattoo work and his musical career.

== Career ==
=== 1997–2005: Early career and The Papercut Chronicles ===
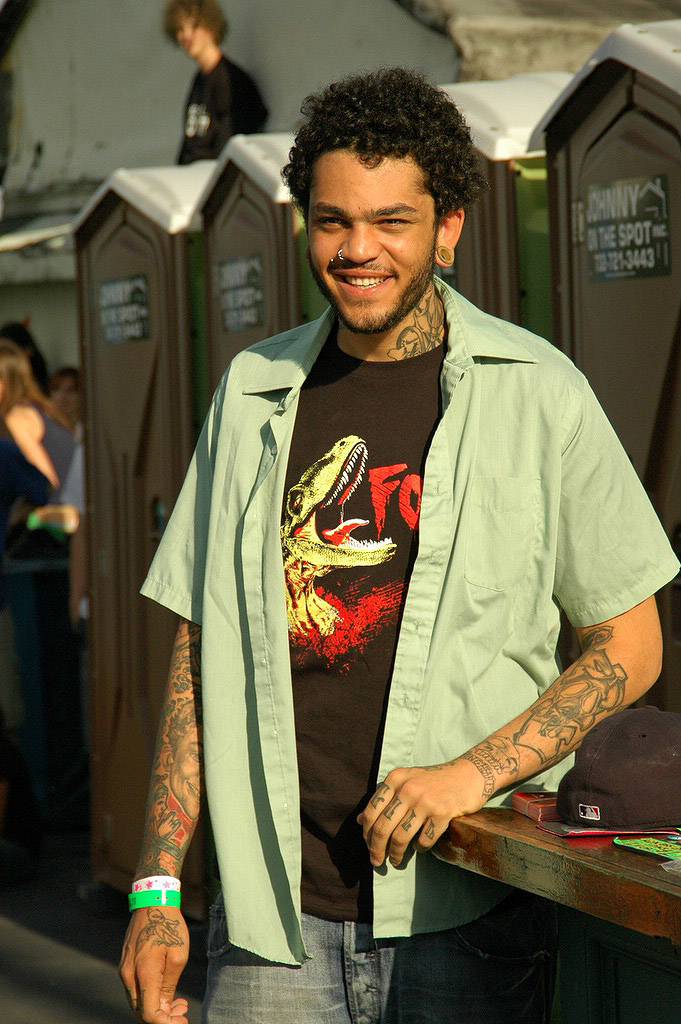
McCoy at The Stone Pony in Asbury Park on June 18, 2005

McCoy befriended drummer Matt McGinley during gym class in the ninth grade. They bonded over a common interest in music, in particular punk rock, indie rock, and hip-hop. They officially formed Gym Class Heroes in 1997. The band originated when bassist Ryan Geise and drummer McGinley were performing at a party in a band with no vocals. McCoy, who was in attendance at the party, took the microphone onstage and started rapping. A week later, the group came together and started making music.

In 2002, McCoy made his MTV debut when he won the MC battle on the show Direct Effect. After guitarist Disashi Lumumba-Kasongo and bassist Eric Roberts joined the band, they signed to Fall Out Boy bassist Pete Wentz's Decaydance Records, an imprint of Fueled by Ramen, and Crush management. They collaborated with Patrick Stump of Fall Out Boy, who sang the chorus on the song "Cupid's Chokehold" from their 2005 album The Papercut Chronicles. The band initially struggled to gain radio airplay because of their genre-blending sound. Wentz recalled that alternative stations considered the group hip-hop, while pop and hip-hop stations were reluctant to play a live band.

=== 2006–2009: Mainstream success with As Cruel as School Children and The Quilt ===
A new version of "Cupid's Chokehold" was released on their 2006 album As Cruel as School Children. The album would become certified gold and spawned the hit singles "Cupid's Chokehold," reaching No. 4 on the Billboard Hot 100 and No. 3 on the UK Singles Chart, and "Clothes Off!!," which was a top-ten hit in the United Kingdom. McCoy was praised for his lyrical style of mixing of humor, pop culture and hip-hop boasting.

McCoy's appearance in Cobra Starship's song "Snakes on a Plane (Bring It)" on the Snakes on a Plane soundtrack further boosted the band's popularity. Gym Class Heroes won the fan-voted Best New Artist award at the 2007 MTV Video Music Awards.

After discovering 17-year-old rapper Tyga in 2007, McCoy founded the imprint BatSquad to sign him and release his debut album, No Introduction (2008). Tyga was presented as McCoy's cousin, but they are not blood relatives. McCoy was Tyga's mentor and was featured on his song "Coconut Juice" in 2008.

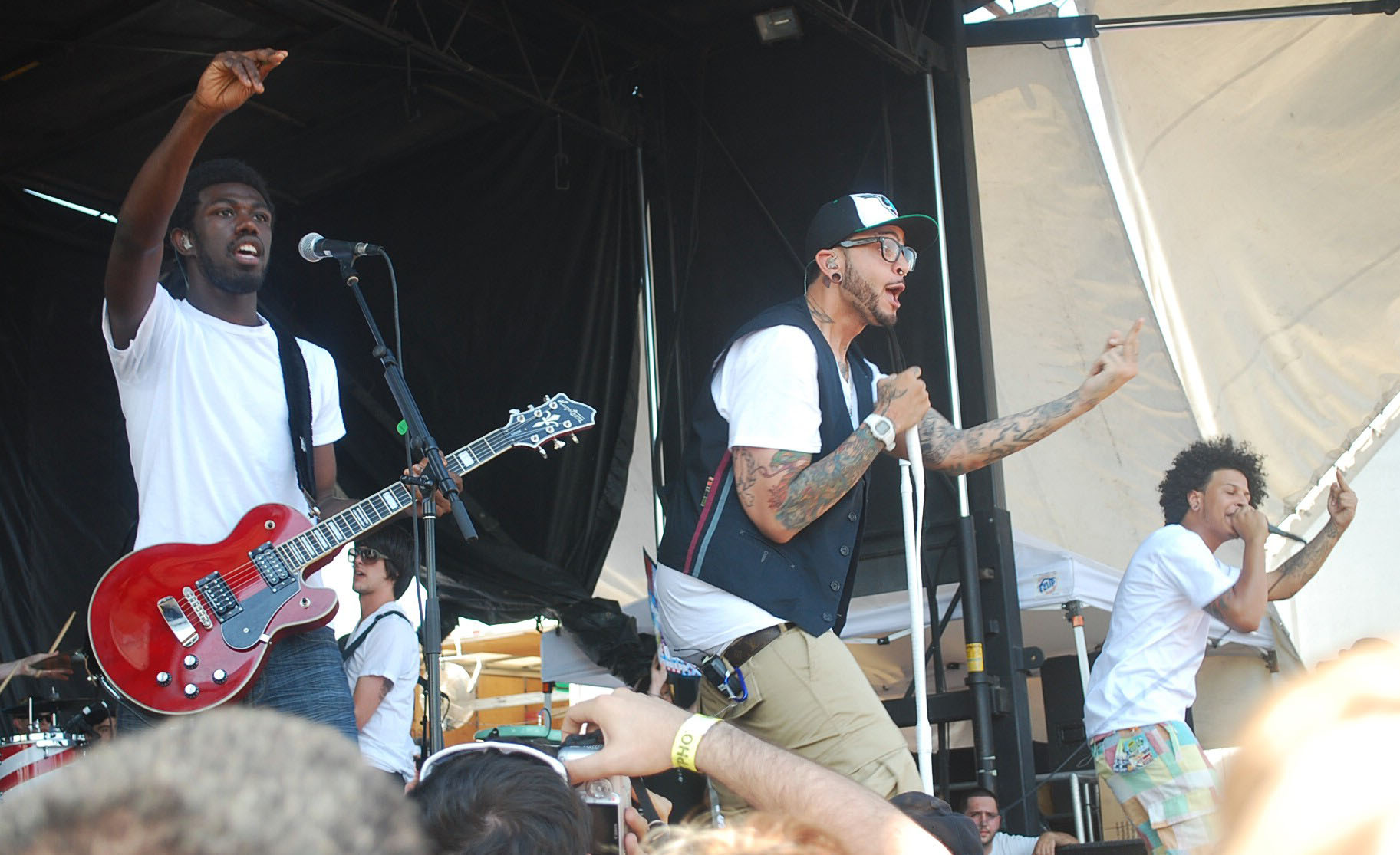
Gym Class Heroes performing at Pomona Fairgrounds during the Warped Tour on June 20, 2008

McCoy collaborated with his musical hero, Daryl Hall of Hall & Oates, who served as the inspiration for the band's 2007 Daryl Hall for President Tour, on the song "Live Forever (Fly with Me)." Hall also invited McCoy to appear on his online concert series Live from Daryl's House. In 2008, Hall told Spin, "Travis has a deep understanding of music and is so creative. He did a mash-up record where he put his songs together with mine. Atlantic is crazy if they don't release it."

Stump produced the majority of their follow-up album The Quilt, which was released on September 9, 2008, and peaked at No. 14 on the US Billboard 200 chart and No. 41 on the UK Albums Chart. The single "Cookie Jar" peaked at No. 6 on the UK Singles Chart. McCoy maintained a presence in thee United Kingdom by presenting the Rock Out Award to Thirty Seconds To Mars at the 2008 MTV Europe Music Awards in Liverpool.

In 2009, McCoy remixed the Bring Me the Horizon song "Chelsea Smile" for their remixes album, Suicide Season: Cut Up!.

=== 2010–2015: Solo career, Lazarus, and The Papercut Chronicles II ===
When McCoy began a solo career in 2010, he denied rumors that Gym Class Heroes had broken up, asserting that "Since the inception of Gym Class in 1997, every member has had another musical outlet, if not three or four. This is just another one of those." McCoy had originally prepared to release an introspective mixtape titled Forgetting Katy Perry, which consisted of "sad and somber" songs reflective of his state of mind following his breakup with singer Katy Perry and his addiction to painkillers. The title is a reference to the film Forgetting Sarah Marshall, starring Russell Brand, who was then engaged to Perry. However, he decided to scrap his early material and start over, calling it "too personal". He explained, "I didn't want that to be my first look as a solo artist," and compared the album to Kanye West's 808s & Heartbreak. He later reflected on the project:

"Had I put out that mixtape, I would've felt like a simp. There were a lot of songs that we did for that mixtape that didn't necessarily have to do with her and our relationship that ended up making it out there. I did a joint with Joe Budden that was fucking crazy. I also did another joint called 'Get High' with Tame One from Artifacts which was one of my favorite joints."

He relocated to Miami, Florida, to record new material and recover from his addiction, which helped him to create a more upbeat album because he "want[ed] to do something positive". McCoy decided to officially call himself "Travie" instead of Travis; he explained that he has been called Travie by friends and family for "as long as [he] can remember". He believes that the new name allows listeners to become "that much closer" to him and to "feel much more comfortable with calling me Travie and being part of the family."

In May 2010, McCoy released the single "Billionaire" with Bruno Mars, which has been certified 4× Platinum by the Recording Industry Association of America (RIAA). His first solo album, Lazarus, was released on June 8, 2010, after being in the works for a year and a half. McCoy stated that he wanted to keep the number of collaborations on the album "kinda tight", but he planned to work with other artists on remixes of the album. The album featured artists and producers such as Bruno Mars, T-Pain, Young Cash, Tim William, the Stereotypes, Evan "Kidd" Bogart, and Detail.

The album debuted at No. 25 on the US Billboard 200 chart and was later certified Gold by the RIAA. On August 21, 2010, Lazarus was released in Europe and entered the UK Albums Chart at No. 69, its peak position. In July and August 2010, McCoy supported Rihanna on some of the North American dates of her Last Girl on Earth Tour. In September 2010, McCoy performed a verse from "Billionaire" at the MTV VMAs. His song "Billionaire" was also performed on the September 21, 2010, episode of Glee. McCoy and Bruno Mars embarked on a 13-date tour of Europe throughout October and November. They played five dates in the United Kingdom, four in Germany and one each in the Netherlands, Denmark, Sweden and France.

The song "Need You" was the second single from Lazarus in the United States, released in September 2010. It was followed by "We'll Be Alright" was released in October 2010, as the second single in the United Kingdom. The song was featured in the movie trailer of Yogi Bear. In November 2010, McCoy performed on the Australian Summerbeatz tour alongside Flo Rida, Jay Sean and Soulja Boy.

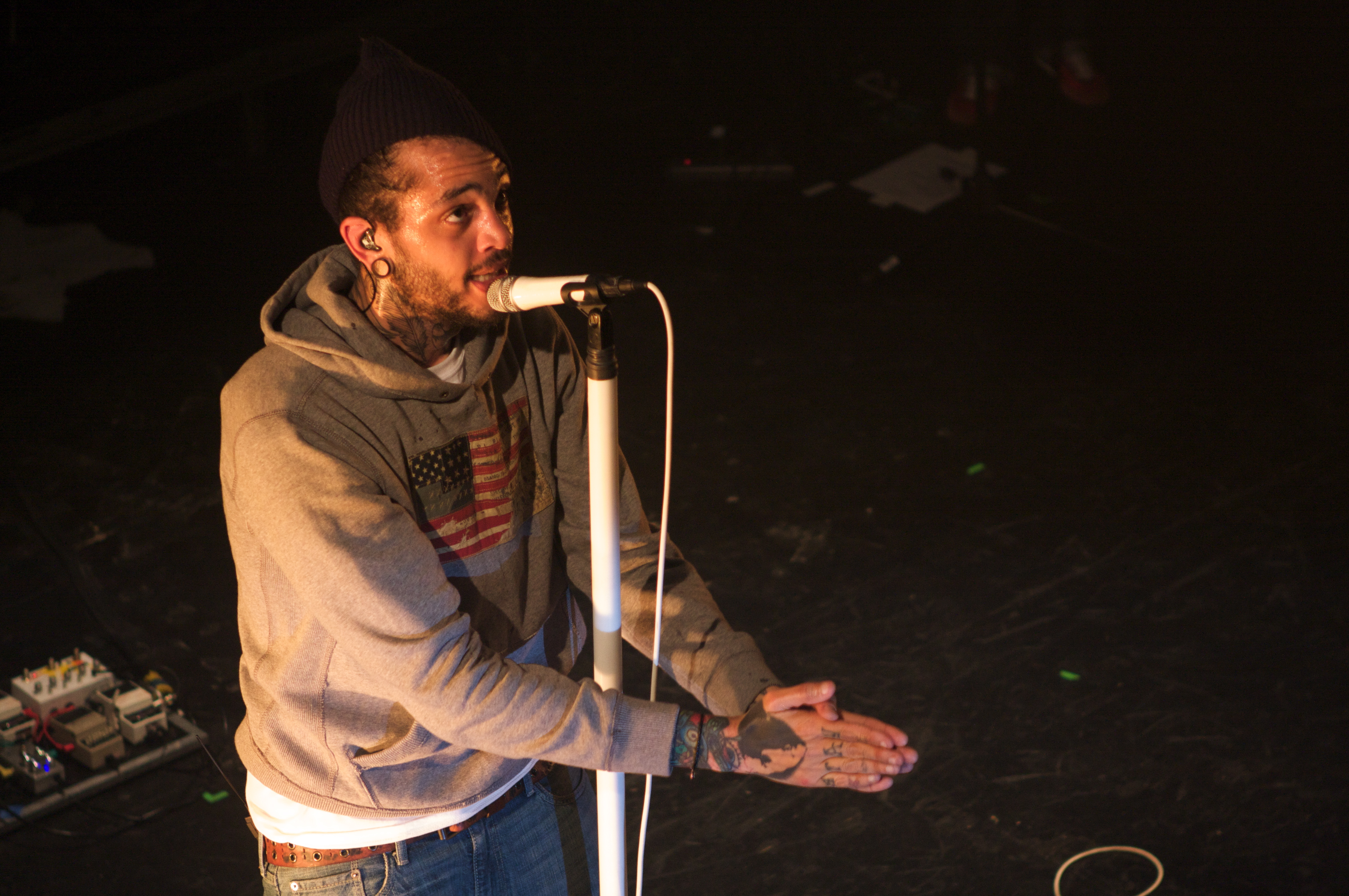
McCoy performing in Montreal, Quebec on March 18, 2011

McCoy is featured on the remix of teen-pop singer Jessica Jarrell's debut single "Up and Running", released through Island Records. In mid-2010 he worked with producer Starsmith and British singer Cheryl Cole; he is featured on the track "Yeah Yeah" of Cole's album Messy Little Raindrops. In November 2010, McCoy collaborated with English R&B artist Taio Cruz on Cruz's single "Higher." McCoy was also featured on hip-hop artist Livin's City of Brotherly Love album, released in early 2011 on 700 Level Entertainment. The track "When I Approach," produced by Sev-One, features McCoy and Joe Budden.

Gym Class Heroes released the album The Papercut Chronicles II in November 2011. The single "Stereo Hearts" reached No. 4 on the Billboard Hot 100. McCoy performed the song with Adam Levine of Maroon 5 on November 5, 2011, on Saturday Night Live. Gym Class Heroes also performed the song with Levine at the 2011 American Music Awards.

In 2012, McCoy collaborated with English girl group Stooshe on their single "Love Me". On April 24, 2012, McCoy's song with ex-Hollywood Undead singer, Deuce, was released on Deuce's album Nine Lives. The title of the track is "I Came to Party". That year, McCoy was a guest star on Malibu Country, in the episode "Shell Games," and sang with Reba McEntire.

In 2013, McCoy released "Rough Water", a single with Jason Mraz. The track was intended to be the lead single from McCoy's second solo album, Rough Water. According to McCoy, the album was "inspired by a tough period with his former girlfriend". In March 2014, he released the single "Keep On Keeping On" featuring Panic! at the Disco frontman Brendon Urie.

McCoy was featured on Olly Murs' hit single "Wrapped Up", released in October 2014. In 2015, McCoy released the single "Golden" featuring Sia, which was certified platinum by the ARIA.

=== 2016–present: Hiatus and Never Slept Better ===
After a long hiatus, McCoy signed with Hopeless Records in 2021. On July 15, 2022, he released his second studio album, Never Slept Better, which was supported by two singles, "A Spoonful of Cinnamon" and "Loved Me Back to Life." Despite receiving mainly positive reviews, neither the album nor any of its singles charted.

In April 2025, Gym Class Heroes were inducted into the Rochester Music Hall of Fame. In July 2026, Gym Class Heroes released the single "Universal Language."

== Personal life ==
McCoy has a close friendship with musician Pete Wentz. McCoy was signed to Wentz's record label Decaydance Records. He is the godfather of Wentz's son with singer Ashlee Simpson, Bronx Mowgli Wentz.

McCoy is an avid sneaker collector. In 2009, it was reported that he had over 200 pairs of sneakers.

=== Relationships ===
We looked really cute together. We get (sic) along better than any other girl I've ever hung out with in my life. That was the beginning of a really really awesome time for me... When I was around her I felt really at ease and comfortable with myself... It was the most amazing thing ever.

— Travie McCoy on his relationship with Katy Perry (2012)

McCoy had a relationship with singer Katy Perry for several years. They met at a recording studio while working with producer Sam Hollander: McCoy was recording the album Cruel As School Children and Perry was working on her debut album One of the Boys. They began casually dating and Perry played McCoy's love interest in the "Cupid's Chokehold" music video in 2006. In June 2008, McCoy gave Perry a diamond promise ring, and he wore a ring bearing her name. Perry told Blender that "soulless hooking up didn't seem so hot to me. I always wanted to have a romance. I said, 'Excuse me, I've been coming to a number of your shows in the greater Los Angeles area for quite some time now. I've been your Penny Lane long enough, and now I want to be your Grace Kelly."

McCoy also supported Perry as her career gained momentum. She joined him on the 2008 Vans Warped Tour. In December 2008, Perry took to her blog to deny a New York Daily News report that the couple were engaged. After spending the holidays together in Mexico, they broke up shortly before New Year's Eve. They reconciled a few months later in April 2009, but spent less time together because of Perry's grueling Hello Katy Tour schedule. Perry ended their relationship by email later that year.

Following their split, Perry reportedly wrote the songs "Circle the Drain" and "Part of Me" about McCoy. He penned the songs "Don't Pretend" and "Need You" about Perry. McCoy told VH1's Behind the Music in 2012: "She wasn't stupid... She knew when I was f**ked up. I chose drugs over our relationship... As things started taking off for her the more I started to doubt my role in her life. There were times I felt like a stepping ladder." He added, "Someone that you are ready to spend the rest of your life with sends you a f**king email just s**ting on your whole parade. It destroyed me."

McCoy was romantically linked to actress Juliette Lewis in 2012.

On November 14, 2022, McCoy married Jessica Phillips McCoy.

=== Health ===
McCoy has been candid about his battle with opioid addiction. He became addicted to pharmaceuticals when he was 15. He was later prescribed Oxycontin after he tore his ACL and MCL. McCoy entered a detox program before Gym Class Heroes was signed, but he said it didn't help much. Following his cousin Isaiah's suicide in November 2007, he "dove in face-first and started snorting my brains out." In 2008, McCoy revealed to Blender that on a few occasions, he had attempted to commit suicide. He recalled, "Two or three years ago, I had a crazy falling-out with a girlfriend and I grabbed a cocktail of pharmaceuticals and drowned them with alcohol. I woke up in the hospital cuffed to a bed."

He went through his second stint in a detox program in early 2008 and took up yoga. In March 2008, McCoy posted on his blog that he was recovering from a procedure that had his opiate receptors cleaned. "I feel like a layer of shit has been peeled off of my brain," he said of the experience, adding that "I felt an enormous amount of guilt for glorifying drug use in our music." He credited his then-girlfriend Katy Perry with convincing him to see a psychiatrist. Still dealing with the death of his cousin and then his breakup with Perry in 2009, McCoy continued to struggle with his pill addiction and he eventually turned to heroin and fentanyl. He has been sober from opioids since 2013.

McCoy was later diagnosed with bipolar disorder.

=== Legal issues ===
On July 2, 2008, McCoy was arrested in St. Louis on a charge of third-degree assault after striking an audience member on the head with a microphone during a Warped Tour concert. McCoy had called the man out for shouting racial slurs at him. McCoy intended to confront the man verbally, but a physical altercation broke out after the man struck McCoy's knee, which was in a brace following a recent sprain. McCoy subsequently apologized for his actions and said it does not represent him as a person. He was released on a $500 bond the following morning.

On October 28, 2010, McCoy was arrested again while on tour in Berlin, Germany for tagging the Berlin Wall. He was later released on €1,500 bail ($2,081), and continued on his European tour in Amsterdam. He later posted a picture of the vandalism on his Twitter account.

=== Philanthropy ===
In 2008, McCoy painted a plaster cast of his then-girlfriend Katy Perry's breasts to raise money for the Keep A Breast Foundation.

While at the MTV European Music Awards in November 2008, McCoy became involved with MTV's Staying Alive Foundation, their global campaign dedicated to HIV/AIDS awareness that funds youth-led grassroots HIV prevention projects. After spending more time with the founder, he was appointed the 2009 ambassador for the foundation. In June 2009, McCoy embarked on a 10-day trip to South Africa, India, and the Philippines with Staying Alive. For World AIDS Day in 2009, MTV networks worldwide premiered The Unbeaten Track, a documentary chronicling his journey. Additionally, McCoy released a charity song called "One At A Time," with all proceeds going to Staying Alive.

In December 2008, McCoy and Pete Wentz had an exhibition of their artwork titled "Without You I’m Just Me" at Gallery 1988 in Los Angeles. The artwork ranged in price from $600 to $4,000, and the profits benefited Invisible Children.

== Discography ==
- Lazarus (2010)
- Never Slept Better (2022)
