= Matt McGinley =

American drummer

- Born: Matthew Ryan McGinley; February 24, 1983 (age 42)
- Origin: New York, United States
- Genres: Hip hop; indie
- Occupations: Musician, drummer
- Instrument: Multi-instrumental
- Years active: 1997–present
- Labels: Fueled by Ramen, Atlantic
- Website: mattmcginleymusic.com

Matthew Ryan "Matt" McGinley (born February 24, 1983) is an American musician and drummer, best known as the co-founder and drummer of Gym Class Heroes and a contributing music producer to the nationally syndicated radio program This American Life.

== Career ==
Matt McGinley is the drummer and co-founder of the band Gym Class Heroes (Atlantic Records). McGinley is a composer whose original music has been used in narrative radio and podcast programming. His work can be heard on series including This American Life, as well as podcasts such as S-Town, Nice White Parents, The Trojan Horse Affair, Question Everything, and season three of Serial.

His work also includes music for commercial advertising and broadcast projects. In 2024, he received a Bronze Award for Best Original Score from the London International Awards and a Bronze Award for Use of Music in Film & Video from the Clio Music Awards.

In addition to his compositional work, McGinley has toured as a musician with artists such as Ryn Weaver, Ra Ra Riot, Wafia, and Ben Abraham.

== Education ==
McGinley attended the State University of New York at Oneonta from 2001 to 2004 and holds a B.A. from Boston University, which he pursued while touring with Gym Class Heroes.
