= Monumentour =

2014 concert tour by Fall Out Boy and Paramore

- Tour by Fall Out Boy and Paramore
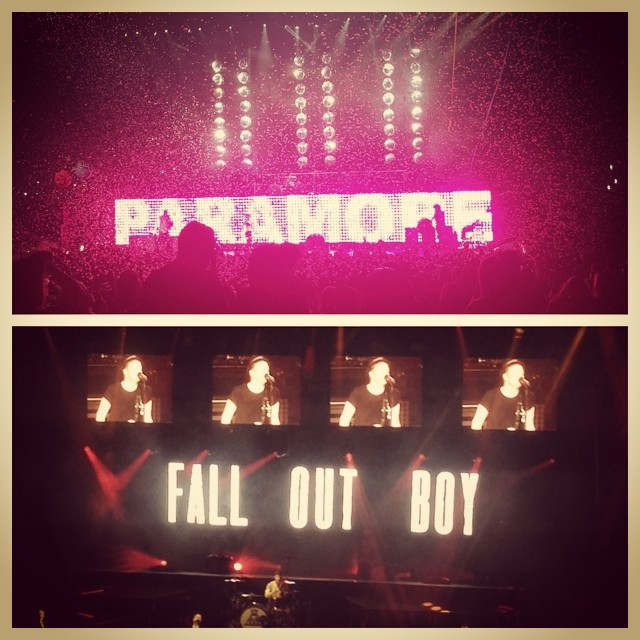
- Paramore (top) and Fall Out Boy (bottom)
- Location: North America
- Associated albums: Save Rock and Roll; Paramore
- Start date: June 19, 2014
- End date: September 12, 2014
- No. of shows: 43
Fall Out Boy tour chronology
Save Rock and Roll Tour (2014)	Monumentour (2014)	American Beauty/American Psycho Tour (2015)
Paramore tour chronology
The Self-Titled Tour (2013–15)	Monumentour (2014)	Writing the Future Tour (2015)

The Monumentour was a co-headlining concert tour by American rock bands Fall Out Boy and Paramore in support of their latest albums, Save Rock and Roll (2013) and Paramore (2013). It was supported by New Politics as the opening band. The tour was set to play a total of forty-four concerts over the course four months in North America. The tour was announced in January 2014, and was later expanded in April 2014. It was the first time the bands toured together, hence the name Monumentour.

== Setlist ==
=== New Politics ===
1. "Give Me Hope"
2. "Berlin"
3. "Fall Into These Arms"
4. "Just Like Me"
5. "Tonight You're Perfect"
6. "Harlem"
7. "Yeah Yeah Yeah"

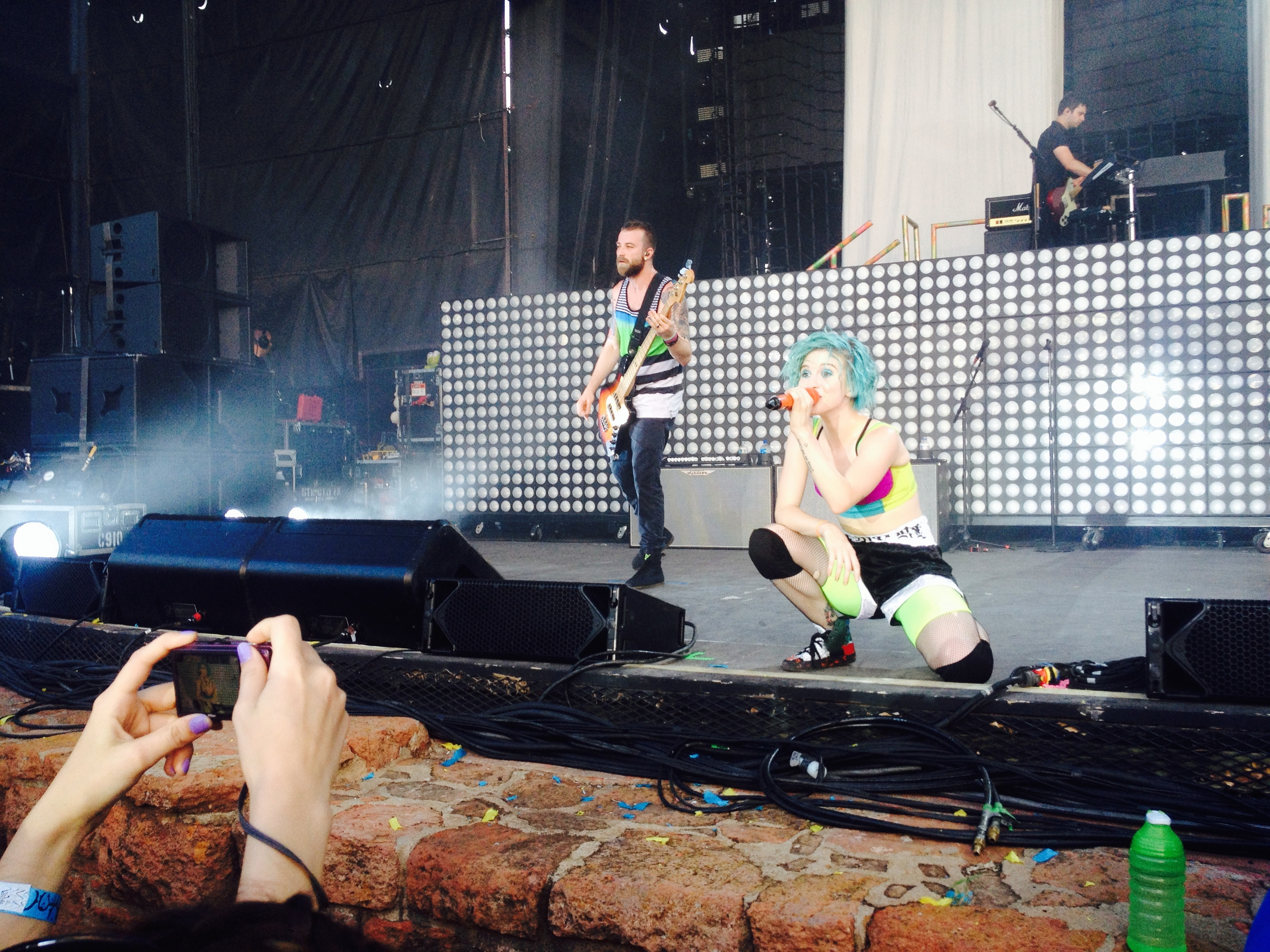
Paramore performing at a Monumentour concert

=== Paramore ===
1. "Still Into You"
2. "That's What You Get"
3. "For a Pessimist, I'm Pretty Optimistic"
4. "Ignorance"
5. "Pressure"
6. "Decode"
7. "The Only Exception"
8. "Last Hope"
9. 9th Song Changes ("Emergency", "Feeling Sorry", "Born for This", "Brick by Boring Brick", and "Fast In My Car")
10. "Misery Business"
11. "Let the Flames Begin"
12. "Part II"
13. "Proof"
  Encore
14. "Ain't It Fun"

Paramore setlist change

- "Emergency" was performed as the ninth song in Hartford, Connecticut on June 19, 2014, the June 25, 2014 show in Toronto, Canada, Tampa, Florida, on July 26 (this was because it was the ninth anniversary of the band's first album All We Know Is Falling and this song was on the album), and the August 31, 2014, show in Scranton, Pennsylvania.
- "Feeling Sorry" was performed as the ninth song in Wantagh, New York on June 21, 2014.
- "Born For This" was performed as the ninth song in Mansfield, Massachusetts on June 22, 2014, the June 27, 2014 show in Camden, New Jersey, and the July 2, show in Darien Center, New York.
- "Brick by Boring Brick" was performed as the ninth song in Saratoga Springs, New York on June 24, 2014, Holmdel Township, New Jersey on June 28, 2014, in Clarkston, Michigan on July 8, 2014, in Tinley Park, Illinois on July 11, in Hershey, Pennsylvania on July 19, 2014, in Raleigh, North Carolina on July 22, 2014, Virginia Beach, Virginia on July 29, 2014, Atlanta, Georgia on July 30, 2014, Phoenix, Arizona on August 8, 2014, Orem, Utah on August 13, 2014, and in Morrison, Colorado on August 12, 2014.
- "Fast In My Car" was performed as the ninth song in Noblesville, Indiana on July 9, 2014.

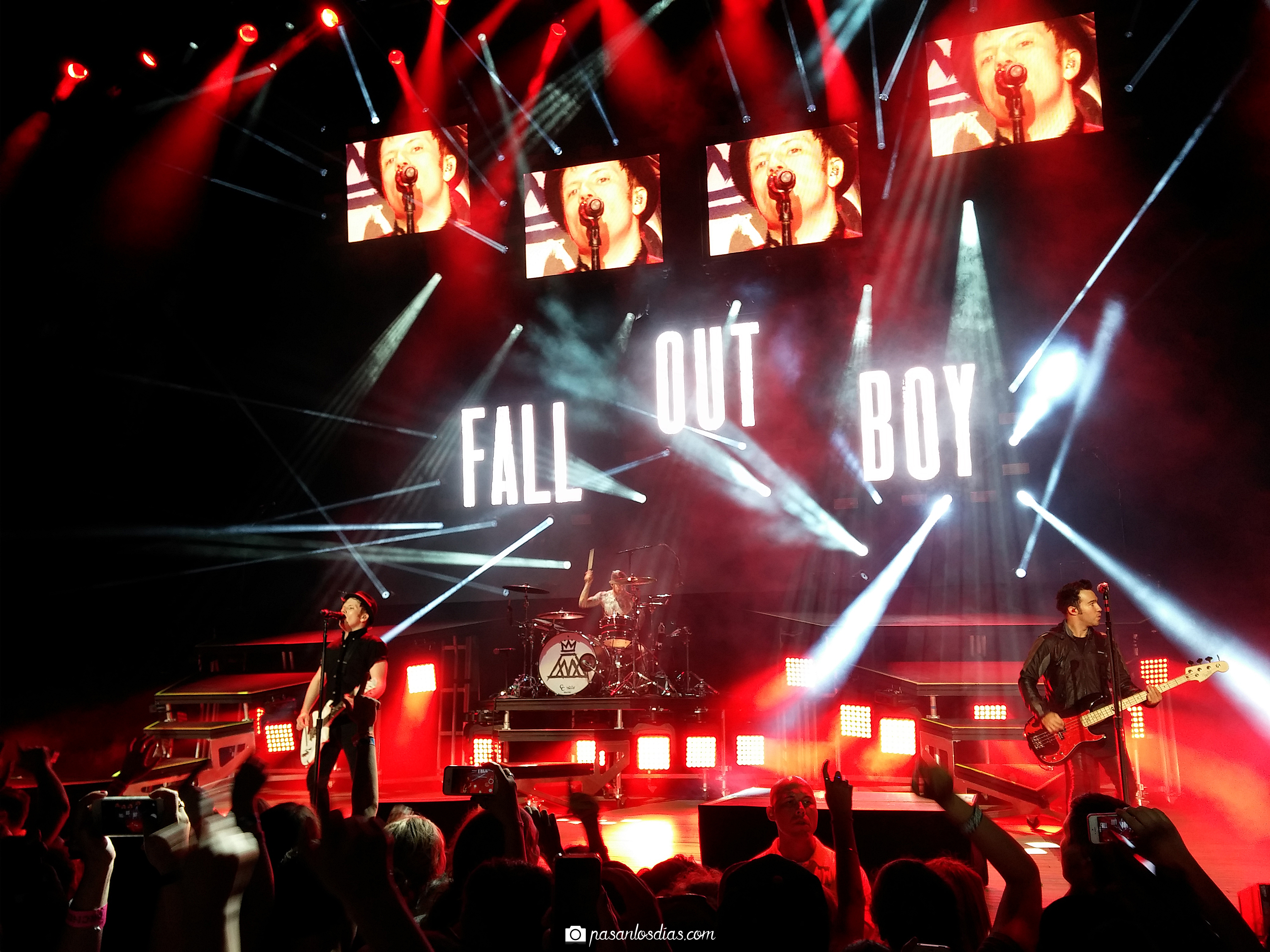
Fall Out Boy performing at a Monumentour concert

=== Fall Out Boy ===
1. "The Phoenix"
2. "The Take Over, the Breaks Over"
3. "A Little Less Sixteen Candles, a Little More "Touch Me""
4. "This Ain't a Scene, It's an Arms Race"
5. "Alone Together"
6. "Death Valley"
7. "Sugar, We're Goin Down"
8. "Miss Missing You"
9. Drum solo
10. (Slayer's Raining Blood intro, Andy and Patrick dueling)
11. "Dance, Dance"
12. "Young Volcanoes"
13. "Just One Yesterday"
14. "Grand Theft Autumn/Where Is Your Boy"
15. "We Are the Champions" (Queen cover)
16. "Save Rock and Roll"
17. "I Don't Care"
18. "My Songs Know What You Did in the Dark (Light Em Up)"
  Encore
19. "Thnks fr th Mmrs"
20. "Saturday"

== Tour dates ==
According to PollStar, the Monumentour grossed about US$8.9 million with an average show earnings of about $325,000. The first three dates alone pulled in $3.3 million.

Date	City	Country	Venue
June 19, 2014	Hartford	United States	Xfinity Theatre
June 21, 2014	Wantagh	United States	Nikon at Jones Beach Theater
June 22, 2014	Mansfield	United States	Xfinity Center
June 24, 2014	Saratoga Springs	United States	Saratoga Performing Arts Center
June 25, 2014	Toronto	Canada	Molson Canadian Amphitheatre
June 27, 2014	Camden	United States	Susquehanna Bank Center
June 28, 2014	Holmdel	United States	PNC Bank Arts Center
June 30, 2014	Gilford	United States	Bank of New Hampshire Pavilion
July 2, 2014	Darien	United States	Darien Lake Performing Arts Center
July 3, 2014	Burgettstown	United States	First Niagara Pavilion
July 5, 2014	Milwaukee	United States	Summerfest
July 6, 2014	Maryland Heights	United States	Verizon Wireless Amphitheater
July 8, 2014	Clarkston	United States	DTE Energy Music Theatre
July 9, 2014	Noblesville	United States	Klipsch Music Center
July 11, 2014	Tinley Park	United States	First Midwest Bank Amphitheatre
July 12, 2014	Cincinnati	United States	Bunbury Music Festival
July 13, 2014 (Fall Out Boy only)	Whites Creek	United States	The Woods Amphitheater at Fontanel
July 18, 2014	Columbia	United States	Merriweather Post Pavilion
July 19, 2014	Hershey	United States	Hersheypark Stadium
July 22, 2014	Raleigh	United States	Walnut Creek Amphitheatre
July 23, 2014	Charlotte	United States	PNC Music Pavilion
July 25, 2014	West Palm Beach	United States	Cruzan Amphitheatre
July 26, 2014	Tampa	United States	MidFlorida Credit Union Amphitheatre
July 27, 2014 (Fall Out Boy only)	St. Augustine	United States	St. Augustine Amphitheatre
July 29, 2014	Virginia Beach	United States	Farm Bureau Live
July 30, 2014	Atlanta	United States	Aaron's Amphitheatre
August 1, 2014	The Woodlands	United States	Cynthia Woods Mitchell Pavilion
August 2, 2014	Austin	United States	Austin360 Amphitheater
August 4, 2014 (Fall Out Boy and New Politics)	Corpus Christi	United States	Concrete Street Amphitheatre
August 5, 2014 (Fall Out Boy only)	Dallas	United States	Gexa Energy Pavilion
August 7, 2014	Albuquerque	United States	Isleta Amphitheater
August 8, 2014	Phoenix	United States	Ak-Chin Pavilion
August 10, 2014	Oklahoma City	United States	Zoo Amphitheatre
August 12, 2014	Morrison	United States	Red Rocks Amphitheatre
August 13, 2014	Orem	United States	UCCU Center
August 15, 2014 (Fall Out Boy and New Politics)	Las Vegas	United States	Cosmopolitan
August 16, 2014	Irvine	United States	Verizon Wireless Amphitheatre
August 17, 2014	Concord	United States	Sleep Train Pavilion
August 28, 2014 (Bad Suns instead of New Politics)	Saint Paul	United States	Minnesota State Fair
August 29, 2014 (Fall Out Boy only)	Mount Pleasant	United States	Soaring Eagle Casino & Resort
August 30, 2014	Toledo	United States	Huntington Center
August 31, 2014	Scranton	United States	Toyota Pavilion
September 12, 2014 (Fall Out Boy and New Politics only)	Puyallup	United States	Washington State Fair
