= Michael Day (guitarist) =

- Born: Chicago, Illinois, U.S.
- Genres: Jazz, soul, funk
- Occupations: Guitarist, singer-songwriter
- Instruments: Guitar, vocals
- Years active: 2010–present

Michael Day is a guitarist, vocalist, songwriter, and teacher from Chicago, Illinois.

== Education ==
Day graduated from the Merit School of Music in Chicago as a kid, has a bachelor's degree in Jazz Guitar Performance from Mason Gross School of the Arts at Rutgers University and a master's degree in Jazz Guitar Performance from Manhattan School of Music.

Michael Day also studied music in Cuba at The National School for the Arts in Havana.

== Career ==
Michael Day has been teaching guitar for about 18 years and has collaborated with the artists Natalie Cole, James Ronstadt, Dan Torres, Jill Stevenson, Amanda Brecker, Asher Monroe, Terre Roche, Loudon Wainwright III, Casey Benjamin, Chloe Temtchine, Derek James, Brent Shuttleworth and Obed Calvaire, but is best known for his work with Patrick Stump (of Fall Out Boy) solo project

Stump's solo project and tour was self funded to promote his album Soul Punk, which was released on October 18, 2011, and supported acts like Panic! at the Disco Joe Jonas, Kelly Clarkson and Bruno Mars. Stump has praised Day's work with the band on a number of occasions.

Day has also been involved in film and television scores, including Through a Dog's Eyes narrated by Neil Patrick Harris and National Geographic documentary Cuba: A Hidden Eden.

His musical influences include Prince, Tears For Fears, Neil Young, Starvinsky, Depeche Mode, R. Kelly, Los Van Van, David Bowie, Trevor Horn, Otis Redding, Peter Gabriel, Sam Cooke, Chaka Khan, Mahler, and Brahms.
