= Young Volcanoes =

Single by Fall Out Boy

from the album Save Rock and Roll
- Released: November 4, 2013
- Recorded: October 2012–March 2013
- Studio: Rubyred Recordings, Venice, California
- Genre: Folk; rock
- Length: 3:24
- Label: Island
- Songwriters: Pete Wentz; Patrick Stump; Joe Trohman; Andy Hurley
- Producer: Butch Walker

Fall Out Boy singles chronology
"Alone Together" (2013)	"Young Volcanoes" (2013)	"Centuries" (2014)

Music video
- "Young Volcanoes" on YouTube

"Young Volcanoes" is a song by American rock band Fall Out Boy, released as the fourth single from their fifth studio album Save Rock and Roll (2013) and commissioned to radio on November 4, 2013. The song was released to YouTube early for streaming before the album's release, joining "My Songs Know What You Did in the Dark (Light Em Up)" and "The Phoenix", although it would be months before its release as a single. The song's accompanying music video was the third to be released as part of The Young Blood Chronicles.

The band has performed the song on TV, such as Jimmy Kimmel Live and the 2014 MDA Show of Strength.

== Background ==
At first, Fall Out Boy frontman Patrick Stump was hesitant to include this song to the Save Rock & Roll album after writing, stating that he was nervous about his vocal contribution. Originally, it was going to be an acoustic song that features Stump's heavy vocals, the very thing Stump was avoiding in their works.

"It was a really hard song for me," he said to Kerrang!. Stump further stated, "I'm much more comfortable now, and very happy with the way I am compared with how I used to be, but I'm very scared of my voice. I don't like hearing it. My natural instinct is 'more guitars, more instruments, more voices', so I have something to hide behind."

== Composition ==
Jason Lipshutz of Billboard described the song as a "stunning rock anthem" which combines elements of "U2, neo-folk and…Train's 'Hey Soul Sister.'" Stephen Thomas Erlewine of AllMusic compared "Young Volcanoes" to the work of British folk rock band Mumford & Sons, stating that the song has a "folk stomp".

== Music video ==
The music video for "Young Volcanoes" follows "The Phoenix" in The Young Blood Chronicles musical film. Stump is strapped to a table, snapping his fingers rhythmically. As the song begins, the Vixens tie the band members to the table into drip blood sucker pipes. They then serve them blood, red wine, and an assortment of Stump's organs, all of this accompanied by drugs, which cause them to hallucinate that the entire affair is simply a party. Meanwhile, the briefcase is delivered to a car with the words "Rat A Tat" on it. The video also ended with Stump snapping.

This video is followed in the series by the video for "Alone Together".

== Charts ==
Chart (2014)	Peak position
UK Singles (Official Charts Company)	64
US Hot Rock & Alternative Songs (Billboard)	38

== Certifications ==
Certifications for Young Volcanoes
Region	Certification	Certified units/sales
United Kingdom (BPI)	Silver	200,000^{‡}
United States (RIAA)	Platinum	1,000,000^{‡}
^{‡} Sales+streaming figures based on certification alone.

== Release history ==
Region	Date	Format	Label
United Kingdom	November 4, 2013	Contemporary hit radio	Island; IDJMG
United States	February 25, 2014	Modern rock radio	Island; IDJMG
