= Save Rock and Roll =

2013 studio album by Fall Out Boy

Studio album by Fall Out Boy
- Released: April 12, 2013
- Recorded: October 2012 – March 2013
- Studio: Rubyred (Venice, California)
- Genre: Pop rock
- Length: 41:37
- Labels: Island; Decaydance
- Producers: Butch Walker; Fall Out Boy

Fall Out Boy chronology
Believers Never Die – Greatest Hits (2009)	Save Rock and Roll (2013)	PAX AM Days (2013)

Singles from Save Rock and Roll
- 1. "My Songs Know What You Did in the Dark (Light Em Up)" Released: February 4, 2013; 2. "The Phoenix" Released: March 24, 2013; 3. "Alone Together" Released: August 6, 2013; 4. "Young Volcanoes" Released: November 4, 2013

Save Rock and Roll is the fifth studio album by the American rock band Fall Out Boy, released on April 12, 2013, by Island Records. It was the band's first album in five years after Folie à Deux (2008).

Fall Out Boy took a hiatus at the end of 2009 after extensive touring stints; each member pursued individual musical interests. Conceived as an attempt to reinvent the band's sound, Save Rock and Roll was recorded in secrecy in California, beginning in the fall of 2012. Produced by the band and Butch Walker, the album marked Fall Out Boy's departure from the longtime producer Neal Avron. Combining rock, pop, and R&B styles, Save Rock and Roll features guest vocals from Foxes, Big Sean, Courtney Love, and Elton John. The lyrics address internal struggles of growing up, experiencing love and heartbreak, and dwelling on nostalgia.

The band filmed music videos for every song on the album, which were compiled and released as The Young Blood Chronicles in 2014. They embarked on an arena tour across Europe, North America, and Australia throughout 2013, and co-headlined the North American concert tour Monumentour with Paramore from June to September 2014. Four songs were released as singles, with the lead single "My Songs Know What You Did in the Dark (Light Em Up)" reaching the top 20 on international charts including the US Billboard Hot 100.

Save Rock and Roll peaked atop the US Billboard 200 and was certified platinum by the Recording Industry Association of America. The album also peaked at number one in Canada and number two in the United Kingdom and Australia, being certified in the first two countries. It revitalized Fall Out Boy's commercial success and received generally positive reviews, although most music critics were hesitant to categorize it as a pure rock record.

== Background ==
In 2009, following two nationwide tours and the release of a greatest hits compilation Believers Never Die – Greatest Hits, the members of Fall Out Boy decided to take a break. The band's decision stemmed from disillusionment with the music industry and the constant promotion of their fourth record Folie à Deux. For the band's, specifically bassist/lyricist Pete Wentz, every movement had become fodder for gossip in tabloids, and lead vocalist/guitarist Patrick Stump recalled that "We found ourselves running on fumes a little bit -- creatively and probably as people, too." In addition, the constant touring schedule had become difficult for the band due to conflicting fan opinion regarding Folie à Deux; concertgoers would "boo the band for performing numbers from the record in concert", leading Stump to describe touring in support of Folie as like "being the last act at the vaudeville show: We were rotten vegetable targets in Clandestine hoods." "Some of us were miserable onstage," said guitarist Joe Trohman. "Others were just drunk." Stump realized the band was desperate to take a break; he sat the group down and explained that a hiatus was in order if the band wanted to continue in the future. All involved felt the dynamic of the group had changed as personalities developed.

Rumors and misquotes led to confusion as to what such a break truly meant; Wentz preferred to not refer to the break as a "hiatus", instead explaining that the band was just "decompressing". Fall Out Boy played its last show at Madison Square Garden on October 4, 2009. Near the end, Blink-182's Mark Hoppus shaved Wentz's head in a move Rolling Stone would later describe as a "symbolic cleansing of the past, but also the beginning of a very dark chapter for the band." By the time the break began, Stump was the heaviest he had ever been and loathed the band's image as an "emo" band. Drummer Andy Hurley "went through the darkest depression [I've] ever felt. I looked at my calendar and it was just empty." Wentz, who had been abusing Xanax and Klonopin, was divorced by his wife Ashlee Simpson and returned to therapy. Wentz recalled: "I'd basically gone from being the guy in Fall Out Boy to being the guy who, like, hangs out all day". Previously known as the "overexposed, despised" leader of the band, Wentz "simply grew up", sharing custody of his son and embracing maturity: "There was a jump-cut in my life. I started thinking – like, being old would be cool."

During the hiatus, the band members each pursued individual musical interests, which were met with "varying degrees of failure." Stump was the only member of the quartet to take on a solo project while Fall Out Boy was on hiatus, recording debut album Soul Punk entirely on his own: he wrote, produced, and played every instrument for all tracks on the record. In addition, he married his longtime girlfriend and lost over sixty pounds through portion control and exercise. Stump blew through most of his savings putting together a large band to tour behind Soul Punk, but ticket sales were sparse and the album stalled commercially. During a particularly dark moment in February 2012, Stump poured his heart out in a 1500-word blog entry called "We Liked You Better Fat: Confessions of a Pariah". In the post, Stump lamented the harsh reception of the record and his status as a "has-been" at 27. Stump revealed that fans harassed him on his solo tour, hurling insults such as "We liked you better fat", and noted: "Whatever notoriety Fall Out Boy used to have prevents me from having the ability to start over from the bottom again." Aside from Soul Punk and personal developments, Stump moonlighted as a professional songwriter/producer, co-writing tracks with Bruno Mars and All Time Low, and pursued acting.

Wentz formed electronic duo Black Cards with vocalist Bebe Rexha in July 2010. The project released one single before album delays led to Rexha's departure in 2011. Black Cards added Spencer Peterson to complete the Use Your Disillusion EP in 2012. Wentz also completed writing a novel, Gray, that he had been working on for six years outside the band, and began hosting the reality tattoo competition show Best Ink. Hurley ventured farther into rock during the hiatus, drumming with multiple bands over the three-year period. He continued to manage his record label, Fuck City, and drummed for bands Burning Empires and Enabler. He also formed heavy metal outfit The Damned Things with Trohman, Scott Ian and Rob Caggiano of Anthrax, and Keith Buckley of Every Time I Die. Despite this, the members all remained cordial to one another, and Wentz was Stump's best man at his wedding. The hiatus was, all things considered, beneficial for the group and its members, according to Hurley. "The hiatus helped them all kind of figure themselves out", he explained in 2013. "Especially Joe and Patrick, who were so young. And Pete is a million times better."

== Composition ==
Save Rock and Roll is a pop rock album that includes elements of contemporary R&B. "The Phoenix" was inspired by Soviet Russian composer Dmitri Shostakovich and drum loops, both of which Stump was interested in at one point in the recording process. While listening to the fourth movement (Allegro non troppo) of Shostakovich's Symphony No. 7, Stump became entranced by a certain string moment and proceeded to build an entirely new song influenced by it. The same orchestral snippet was employed as a sample by German hip-hop artist Peter Fox in his 2008 single "Alles neu" from the album Stadtaffe. Save Rock and Roll has been described to contain "pulsating disco grooves [and] stacked-harmony hair-metal singing." The title track, "Save Rock and Roll", samples a vocal track of "Chicago Is So Two Years Ago", from Take This to Your Grave.

== Recording ==
It was starting at square one again. Where it's like, 'Hey, I guess we're a new band.' And it was fearless, because we didn't have anything to lose.

— Patrick Stump on the band's pop-based reinvention

The album's earliest origins lie in unsuccessful writing sessions between Patrick Stump and Pete Wentz. The two met up in early 2012 to write for the first time in nearly four years. Wentz reached out to Stump after he penned his letter, as he too felt he was in a dark place and needed a creative outlet. He was at first reluctant to approach Stump, likening the phone call to reconnecting with a lover after years of acrimony. Wentz told Stump "I know what you need – you need your band", and said: "I think it's kind of weird that we haven't really seen each other this year. We paid for each others houses and you don't know my kid". The duo recorded demos on GarageBand at Stump's personal home studio in Hollywood Hills. The result, "three or four" new songs, were shelved with near immediacy, with the two concluding that "it just wasn't right and didn't feel right."

Several months later, the two reconvened and wrote tracks that they felt truly represented the band in a modern form. After writing "Where Did the Party Go", both musicians became excited as momentum continued to grow. The band decided that if a comeback was in order, it must represent the band in its current form: "We didn't want to come back just to bask in the glory days and, like, and collect a few checks and pretend ... and do our best 2003 impersonation", said Stump. Afterwards, the quartet held an all-day secret meeting at their manager's home in New York City where they discussed ideas and the mechanics of getting together to record. Trohman was the last to be contacted, through a three-hour phone call from Stump. As Trohman was arguably the most excited to begin other projects, he had a list of stipulations for rejoining the band. "If I'm not coming back to this band writing music […] then I don't want to", he remarked, and Stump disarmed him: "He said I needed to be writing more."

Save Rock and Roll was recorded primarily at Rubyred Recordings in Santa Monica, California from October 2012 to March 2013. The band's main goal was to reinvent the sound of the group from scratch, creating what Trohman called a "reimagining of the band", which focuses more on pop. Sessions were not without their difficulties, as the band struggled initially to produce new material. Walker had doubts about the band's volatility, feeling the record would not be made following "meltdown after meltdown". When the band members learned that Elton John was a fan of their music, they jokingly suggested that he might want to record with them. John complied, and Stump flew to Atlanta late in production, halting the mixing process, to record with him. He was very positive regarding the album's direction: "He actually spoke up for the album's title. He came in and was like, 'Love the album title. Love where this is going. This is great'", said Stump.

The entire album was recorded in secrecy from the music industry, critics, and fans of the band. Stump recalled: "There was a couple times there was paparazzi that got us outside and didn't put two and two together". The decision to keep recording a secret was partially so that the group members had the option to not make the record if the sessions did not work out. Keeping the secret was difficult, especially for a group so visible on social media; Hurley stayed away from Twitter, and all members got as far away from one another in public as possible. Rumors began to swirl in late 2012 after a friend of the band tweeted that the band was in the process of recording new material, though each member of the band was quick to deny any chance of a reunion. The band remained tight-lipped until the very end; when the Chicago Tribune asked Wentz a week prior to the announcement whether a Fall Out Boy reunion was happening, he replied: "It's not." Plans nearly went sideways when Wentz went to dinner with rapper 2 Chainz to discuss plans for the "My Songs Know What You Did in the Dark (Light Em Up)" video. Following the conversation, 2 Chainz posted to Instagram a photo of Wentz and himself with the caption "Fall Out Boyz feat. 2 Chainz?" To the members of Fall Out Boy's surprise and relief, fans of the band denied the possibility, finding the idea too absurd. Stump recalls he wrote "somewhere near 25%" of the lyrics, the most since on Take This to Your Grave.

== Packaging ==
The title originated as a tongue-in-cheek remark after Wentz envisioned album reviews that would sarcastically state that the band "came back to save rock and roll." It was also partially inspired by the return of rock-based acts on contemporary hit radio, such as the success of recent Fun and Gotye singles.

The cover of Save Rock and Roll features a photograph of two young boys—one wearing traditional Buddhist monk robes, the other in jeans and a T-shirt (originally an AC/DC shirt from their album Black Ice, but airbrushed out for Save Rock and Roll due to presumed legal issues), smoking a cigarette—taken by Roger Stonehouse in Myanmar. The image was found early on in the production process, as the band scoured the Internet for inspirational images. The band members felt that the photo "really solidified what [they] were trying to get across on the record: The idea of old and new clashing. Tradition and change coming together".

An alternate album cover exists, which depicts the band name and album title on a red background.

== Promotion ==
While specifically denying that the announcement was a reunion because "[we] never broke up", the band announced a reunion tour and details of Save Rock and Roll on February 4, 2013. The quartet's announcement included a photo of them, taken earlier that morning, huddled around a bonfire, tossing copies of the band's back catalog into the flames at the original location of 1979's Disco Demolition Night. The band performed an "intimate" show the same night at Chicago's Subterranean, followed by two more club slots in New York City and Los Angeles the same week. Stump playfully chided the hometown crowd at the Subterranean: "I told you we were gonna come back! Why didn't you believe me?"

Save Rock and Roll was originally slated for release on May 7, in order to coincide with the 10th anniversary of the band's Take This to Your Grave album, but the date was pulled forward to April after the lead single and the band's comeback were met with commercial and critical success. The album was posted in its entirety on the band's official website eight days prior to its release, as to avoid a leak.

=== Singles ===
The record's lead single, "My Songs Know What You Did in the Dark (Light Em Up)", shot up to number two on iTunes within hours of its release. It peaked at number 13 on the Billboard Hot 100, marking the band's first top twenty single since the group's 2008 cover of Michael Jackson's "Beat It". "My Songs" would shortly sell 5 million downloads in the US to be certified 5× Platinum by the RIAA, and also peak at number five on the UK Singles Chart. The band promoted the song with TV performances and in acoustic version at radio interviews.

Fall Out Boy announced on June 24 that the next single would be "The Phoenix" via the group's Facebook page. It was released to American modern rock radio on July 16.

A month later, the band announced that "Alone Together" would be the album's third single, with a release to pop radio set for August 6, 2013. The single peaked at number 71 on the Billboard Hot 100 and spent 8 weeks on the chart, and was certified Platinum by the RIAA.

"Young Volcanoes" was later announced as the fourth single from the album. It officially impacted radio in the United Kingdom on November 4, coinciding with the band's performance at the O2 Academy Islington, and later peaked at number 64 on the UK Singles Chart.

=== The Young Blood Chronicles ===
Inspired in part by Daft Punk's Electroma, the band released a music video for all eleven songs on the album in a series titled The Young Blood Chronicles between February 2013 and May 2014. All eleven videos were shown as one continuous film on May 21, 2014, on Palladia.

=== Save Rock and Roll Tour and Save Rock and Roll Arena Tour ===
As soon as Fall Out Boy came off of its hiatus, a tour supporting Save Rock and Roll was announced for the summer of 2013, in addition to the one-off comeback dates in selected cities. Fall Out Boy played in various small concert venues and clubs for this tour. On May 13, it was announced that Fall Out Boy would go on a Save Rock and Roll Arena Tour for the fall of 2013 with support from Panic! at the Disco and Twenty One Pilots. The band also played headlining concerts and festivals worldwide, including dates in Europe and Asia. On July 29, Fall Out Boy announced a Save Rock And Roll Australian tour with British India, beginning October 22 and spanning four dates across four cities; Fall Out Boy had played two Australian dates seven months earlier. Throughout 2013, Fall Out Boy guest performed on many TV shows and music award ceremonies. It was later announced that the band would also host the Save Rock & Roll European Tour, playing at sixteen cities between February and March 2014. Seven of the dates were in the UK. The support acts were announced on December 2, 2013; they were The Pretty Reckless and New Politics.

On September 13, 2013, Fall Out Boy headlined Riot Fest in the group's hometown of Chicago. The band's set featured a guest appearance from Jeff Pezzati of Naked Raygun and the appearance of the Stanley Cup won earlier that summer by the hometown Blackhawks.

=== Monumentour ===
Fall Out Boy and Paramore co-headlined the Monumentour North American arena concert tour, announced in January 2014 and beginning April 2014, marking the first time the bands toured together since 2005. It was supported by New Politics as the opening band. The tour consisted of 44 concerts over the course of four months.

== Critical reception ==
Professional ratings
Aggregate scores
Source	Rating
AnyDecentMusic?	6.7/10
Metacritic	75/100
Review scores
Source	Rating
AllMusic	3.5/5 stars
Alternative Press	4/5 stars
The A.V. Club	B+
Billboard	4/5 stars
Entertainment Weekly	B
The Guardian	3/5 stars
The Independent	3/5 stars
NME	7/10
Rolling Stone	3.5/5 stars
USA Today	3/4 stars

Save Rock and Roll has received mostly positive reviews from music critics, making the band's reformation a critical success. At Metacritic, a website which assigns a rating out of 100 from reviews by mainstream critics, it currently holds a rating of 75 based on 18 reviews, citing "generally favorable reviews". Stephen Thomas Erlewine of AllMusic commended the record's compositions as "ambitious, admirable, and sometimes thrilling, particularly because the group never fears to tread into treacherous waters, happy to blur the distinctions between pop and rock, mainstream and underground." Kyle Ryan of The A.V. Club called the record "the band's most personal album yet, a tribute to being passionate and young when time makes the former difficult and the latter impossible. It's an arena album that longs for small punk clubs." Annie Zaleski of Alternative Press also gave the album a positive review, calling it "a blast of an album", and stating:

It's also gutsy: No matter what direction Fall Out Boy went, people would be disappointed. So to release a collection of music that's a noticeable progression from their past albums—but one done entirely on their own terms—is brave. Save Rock and Roll might not actually, well, save rock and roll—but it certainly has brought Fall Out Boy back from the brink.

Dave Simpson of The Guardian was positive in his description of the music on the album: "Each track fuses punk-pop, boyband production values and heart-style power-balladry to make a big enough noise to accompany fireworks in stadiums." Kyle Anderson of Entertainment Weekly described Save Rock and Roll as a stairway to a new era for the band, writing: "There's not much psychological processing on Save Rock and Roll, but it does advance FOB's vision of an über-inclusive guitar-pop utopia." Rolling Stone's Simon Vozick-Levinson characterized the record as full of "over-the-top ambitions", summarizing by saying: "Does rock's future depend on this overheated nonsense? Of course not. But life is more fun with Fall Out Boy than without them." At USA Today, Brian Mansfield concluded with "Fall Out Boy may not be rock and roll's saviors, but they make sure it's got a little life left."

Johan Wippsson of Melodic gave a more critical review, writing that "Fall Out Boy is not the band that will save rock and roll". He added that "like many other bands, they have added some more electronic elements, which makes Save Rock and Roll a bit too well produced and non-organic." Andy Baber of musicOMH called the album both the group's "softest" and the group's "least memorable." At The Oakland Press, Gary Graff found that the "11-song set has more in common with Rihanna than the Ramones, which will undoubtedly polarize those faithful".

== Commercial performance ==
Save Rock and Roll debuted at number one on the Billboard 200 chart, with first week sales of 154,000 copies in the United States, according to Nielsen SoundScan. Fall Out Boy had been in a sales race with rapper Kid Cudi, whose Indicud was released the same day and debuted at number two. Initially, industry sources had forecast both albums to sell around 150,000, but Save Rock and Roll pulled ahead by the end of the tracking week. The arrival of Save Rock and Roll posted the quartet's then-third biggest sales week, and earned the band its second career number one on the chart. The album also debuted at number one on Billboard's Top Rock Albums and Top Alternative Albums charts. In its second week, it fell to number five on the Billboard 200 with 36,000 sales, a 76% decline. As of January 2015, Save Rock and Roll has sold over 670,000 copies. The week ending April 4, 2015 marked its 100th chart week at No. 95.

On the UK album chart, it debuted at number two with 24,809 copies. It was later certified Gold by the British Phonographic Industry for 100,000 copies shipped. On the Canadian Albums Chart, Save Rock and Roll debuted at number one with 8,000 first week sales, and later achieved Gold status for 40,000 shipments. It opened at number two in both Australia and New Zealand.

The band's chart success was best described as unexpected by music journalists. Rolling Stone called the band's comeback a "rather stunning renaissance", and Entertainment Weekly called the number one a "major accomplishment for a band whom many in the industry had dismissed as kings of a genre whose time had passed."

== Track listing ==
All songs written and composed by Fall Out Boy (Andy Hurley, Joe Trohman, Patrick Stump and Pete Wentz), except where noted.

No.	Title	Writer(s)	Length
1.	"The Phoenix"		4:04
2.	"My Songs Know What You Did in the Dark (Light Em Up)"	Hurley; Stump; Trohman; Wentz; Butch Walker; John Hill	3:06
3.	"Alone Together"		3:23
4.	"Where Did the Party Go"		4:03
5.	"Just One Yesterday" (featuring Foxes)		4:04
6.	"The Mighty Fall" (featuring Big Sean)	Hurley; Stump; Trohman; Wentz; Walker; Hill; Sean Anderson	3:32
7.	"Miss Missing You"		3:30
8.	"Death Valley"		3:46
9.	"Young Volcanoes"		3:24
10.	"Rat a Tat" (featuring Courtney Love)	Hurley; Stump; Trohman; Wentz; Courtney Love	4:02
11.	"Save Rock and Roll" (featuring Elton John)		4:41
Total length:			41:37

PAX AM Days edition disc 2
No.	Title	Length
1.	"We Were Doomed from the Start (The King Is Dead)"	1:35
2.	"Art of Keeping Up Disappearances"	1:03
3.	"Hot to the Touch, Cold on the Inside"	1:24
4.	"Love, Sex, Death"	1:23
5.	"Eternal Summer"	1:45
6.	"Demigods"	1:50
7.	"American Made"	1:38
8.	"Caffeine Cold"	2:41
Total length:		13:19

Japanese bonus track
No.	Title	Writer(s)	Length
12.	"My Songs Know What You Did in the Dark (Light Em Up)" (2 Chainz remix)	Hurley; Stump; Trohman; Wentz; Walker; Hill; Tauheed Epps	3:31
Total length:			45:08

Japanese deluxe DVD
No.	Title	Length
1.	"My Songs Know What You Did in the Dark (Light Em Up)" (music video)	3:08
2.	"Track-by-track commentary"

Japanese PAX AM Days edition disc 1 bonus tracks
No.	Title	Length
12.	"My Songs Know What You Did in the Dark (Light Em Up)" (2 Chainz remix)	3:31
13.	"Alone Together" (Jump Smokers remix)	3:42
14.	"Alone Together" (Krewella remix)	3:21
Total length:		52:11

- "Save Rock and Roll" contains an interpolation of the band's own song "Chicago Is So Two Years Ago", which appeared on the group's debut album Take This to Your Grave.

== Personnel ==
Credits adapted from the liner notes

Fall Out Boy

- Patrick Stump – lead vocals, guitar, keyboards, piano, additional programming and production
- Joe Trohman – guitar, backing vocals, keyboards, additional production and programming
- Pete Wentz – bass guitar, backing vocals, additional production
- Andy Hurley – drums, percussion, backing vocals, additional production

Additional musicians

- Big Sean – guest vocals on "The Mighty Fall"
- Courtney Love – guest vocals on "Rat a Tat"
- Elton John – guest vocals on "Save Rock and Roll"
- Foxes – guest vocals on "Just One Yesterday"

Artwork

- Roger Stonehouse – cover photography
- Pamela Littky – band photography
- Marjan Malakpour – styling
- Todd Russell – art direction and design
- Kristen Yiengst – art and photography production
- Carol Corless – package production

Production

- Butch Walker – producer, additional backing vocals, percussion, programming, keyboards
- Jake Sinclair – engineer, additional backing vocals, percussion, programming, keyboards
- Produced by Mike Viola and Ryan Adams
- Vocal producing (Elton John vocals) by Peter Asher
- Todd Stopera – assistant engineer
- Laura Sisk – engineer on "My Songs Know What You Did in the Dark (Light Em Up)" and "The Mighty Fall"
- Grant Wndrbrd Michaels – engineer "Rat a Tat" (Courtney Love vocals)
- Matt Still – engineer on "Save Rock and Roll" (Elton John vocals)
- Manny Sanchez – additional engineering and production on "Miss Missing You" and "Rat a Tat"
- Engineered and mixed by David Labrel
- Dave Sardy – mixing
- Mark "Spike" Stent – mixing on "My Songs Know What You Did in the Dark (Light Em Up)"
- Matty Green – assistant mixing on "My Songs Know What You Did in the Dark (Light Em Up)"
- Greg Calbi – mastering
- Joe Laporta – mastering on "The Mighty Fall", "Rat a Tat" and "Save Rock and Roll"
- Mastered by Bernie Grundman
- Rob Mathes – orchestral arrangement and conductor on "The Phoenix" and "Save Rock and Roll"
- London Symphony Orchestra – orchestration on "The Phoenix" and "Save Rock and Roll"
- Additional composers: John Hill, Butch Walker, Courtney Love (10) and Sean Anderson (6)
- Todd Russell – art direction and design
- Kristen Yiengst – art and photo-production
- Carol Corless – package production
- Roger Stonehouse – cover photo
- Pamela Littky – band photo
- Marjan Malakpour – styling

== Charts ==
=== Weekly charts ===
Chart (2013)	Peak position
Australian Albums (ARIA)	2
Austrian Albums (Ö3 Austria)	10
Canadian Albums (Billboard)	1
Belgian Albums (Ultratop Flanders)	41
Belgian Albums (Ultratop Wallonia)	60
Danish Albums (Hitlisten)	27
Dutch Albums (Album Top 100)	48
Finnish Albums (Suomen virallinen lista)	37
French Albums (SNEP)	25
German Albums (Offizielle Top 100)	15
New Zealand Albums (RMNZ)	2
Norwegian Albums (VG-lista)	40
Scottish Albums Chart (OCC)	2
Spanish Albums (Promusicae)	67
Swiss Albums (Schweizer Hitparade)	31
UK Albums (Official Charts)	2
UK Rock & Metal Albums (Official Charts)	2
US Billboard 200	1
US Top Alternative Albums (Billboard)	1
US Digital Albums (Billboard)	1
US Top Rock Albums (Billboard)	1
US Vinyl Albums (Billboard)	1

=== Year-end charts ===
Chart (2013)	Position
UK Albums (OCC)	89
US Billboard 200	59
US Top Alternative Albums (Billboard)	9
US Top Rock Albums (Billboard)	12
Chart (2014)	Position
US Billboard 200	81
US Top Alternative Albums (Billboard)	14
US Top Rock Albums (Billboard)	17
Chart (2015)	Position
US Billboard 200	91
US Catalog Albums (Billboard)	19

== Certifications ==
Certifications for Save Rock and Roll
Region	Certification	Certified units/sales
Canada (Music Canada)	Gold	40,000^{^}
Denmark (IFPI Danmark)	Gold	10,000^{‡}
New Zealand (RMNZ)	Platinum	15,000^{‡}
Singapore (RIAS)	Gold	5,000^{*}
United Kingdom (BPI)	Platinum	300,000^{‡}
United States (RIAA)	2× Platinum	2,000,000^{‡}
^{*} Sales figures based on certification alone.^{^} Shipments figures based on certification alone.^{‡} Sales+streaming figures based on certification alone.

== Release history ==
Region	Date	Label	Format
Australia/Europe	April 12, 2013	Island Records	Digital download; CD; vinyl
United Kingdom	April 15, 2013	Island Records	Digital download; CD; vinyl
United States	April 16, 2013	Island Records	Digital download; CD; vinyl
