= The Young Blood Chronicles =

2014 film directed by Adam Donald and Andrew Zaeh

- Directed by: Adam Donald; Andrew Zaeh
- Story by: Fall Out Boy
- Produced by: Shamikah Martinez
- Starring: Patrick Stump; Pete Wentz; Joe Trohman; Andy Hurley; Big Sean; 2 Chainz; Foxes; Courtney Love; Elton John; Tommy Lee; Samuel Caruana
- Cinematography: Adam Donald
- Edited by: Adam Donald
- Music by: Fall Out Boy
- Production company: MAD Pictures
- Distributed by: Island Records
- Release date: May 21, 2014
- Running time: 50 minutes
- Country: United States
- Language: English

The Young Blood Chronicles is a 2014 American musical film composed of music videos produced by Fall Out Boy, featuring each song from the group's fifth studio album, Save Rock and Roll (2013). The eleven separate videos were uploaded online gradually, but also link together to form the narrative film, which made its premiere on May 21, 2014 on television network Palladia. The film stars the members of Fall Out Boy – Patrick Stump, Pete Wentz, Joe Trohman and Andy Hurley – and also features guest appearances from 2 Chainz, Big Sean, Foxes, Courtney Love, Elton John and Tommy Lee. The Young Blood Chronicles was also released as a limited edition DVD on July 14, 2014.

== Plot ==
The plot is based on the uncut long-form edit of the movie. The original was split into 11 separate music videos, each released individually, beginning with the music video for "The Phoenix" and ending with "Save Rock and Roll"; despite its placement after "Alone Together", "My Songs Know What You Did In The Dark (Light Em Up)"'s music video was released prior to "The Phoenix".

=== The Phoenix ===
The Defenders of the Faith (Fall Out Boy) are in possession of a glowing briefcase, which Stump handcuffs to his left hand. As he heads out down the sidewalk, he sees a young boy, “The Kid” (Samuel Caruana), that distracts him while a woman stuns him from behind with a taser and kidnaps him. Stump is taken to a room where he is tied to a chair and his hand is strapped to a cutting board by two women. After some tormenting, the women cut off Stump's hand, freeing the briefcase. They continue to torture him by inserting probes into him and removing some of his organs. The Kid delivers Stump's hand in a plastic bag to Wentz's house. After finding the hand, Wentz releases a hawk that symbolizes "The Phoenix." The other members are also kidnapped by a group of women called the "Vixens": Hurley in a parking lot, Trohman at a gas station, and Wentz on a rooftop.

=== Young Volcanoes ===
The Vixens bring Wentz, Hurley, and Trohman to a dinner table, blindfolded, at which Stump is already seated, fully aware of what is happening. They are strapped to chairs and hooked to intravenous drips. They are served blood wine, hookahs and sniffable coloured powder resembling cocaine. The women then serve them cobbler, fruit, and Stump's organs. The drugs make them believe they are dancing with their captors and naked women wearing bloody animal masks, yet they are left still bound to their chairs. The briefcase is delivered to a vehicle with the license plate "RATATAT".

=== Alone Together ===
Stump, Wentz, Hurley, and Trohman are bound and set up to be tormented in separate rooms in an abandoned building. Stump is hooked to machines in a chapel, Wentz surrounded by paparazzi-like mannequins, Trohman subjected to angry children throwing food and Hurley forced to listen to loud music and watch television. Wentz seduces one of his captors, then kills her with a hook she was wearing. He runs down the corridors of the building looking for the others while escaping the Vixens. Wentz frees "The Herald" (Big Sean) and while attempting to rescue Stump, attaches the hook to where his hand was. Wentz fails to free him as the women shoot him with a tranquilizing dart. In the meantime, the device Stump is hooked to slowly, with a gauge that says "Evil-Meter", turns him more and more evil.

The band is handcuffed, blindfolded, and forced into a van.

=== My Songs Know What You Did In The Dark (Light Em Up) ===
"The Problem Solver" (2 Chainz), with assistance from Vixens, burns and destroys various Fall Out Boy merchandise. The video ends by showing the tied up and bound Defenders in the back of a van.

=== The Mighty Fall ===
The van the Defenders are trapped in is set on fire, but they are unbound by Stump's hook and escape in time. They are welcomed to a gang of children led by The Kid, armed with various weapons. The band flees to the woods, with the kids on their tail. All but Stump are eventually caught and beaten by the children. Stump escapes to an open patch of the forest. The Kid corners Stump with a boombox, the sound from which transforms Stump to his evil, yellow-eyed state. The Herald saves Stump by killing the Kid, yet is beaten and killed by the Vixens. The remaining children cease their violence and flee, while the band members they have beaten all collapse in the woods.

=== Just One Yesterday ===
The band wakes up the next morning in the forest, separated and barely aware of what happened the night before. While desperately looking for help and civilization, they each encounter the same snake from the previous "Young Volcanoes" video, which triggers their memories. Stump hitches a ride from a woman driving a 1968 Dodge D100 (Foxes) who finds and picks up the rest of the Defenders. She pulls up to an abandoned hospital, where it is revealed that she, "The Death Adder", is also evil. Her eyes turn pure black, and she then plays her truck's radio, the same music in the Kid's boom box, sending Stump back into his trance. Wentz, Hurley and Trohman flee into the hospital as Stump preys on them.

=== Where Did The Party Go ===
Wentz, Hurley and Trohman split up and hide in different parts of the hospital as Stump searches for them. Stump hallucinates, seeing zombie nurses and patients partying, yet still continues his hunt. Wentz tries to fix a phone to dial for help, Hurley treats his wounds, and Trohman hides in a closet. Eventually, Stump tracks down Trohman and strangles him to death with an extension cord. As Wentz and Hurley come upon the murder, Stump then exits his trance, horrified at what he has done.

=== Death Valley ===
Trohman, on his way to heaven, is stopped by the Kid and is sent to hell instead.

Stump is detained by law enforcement and his hook is removed for booking and detainment. Wentz and Hurley are brought in for questioning. Trohman is checked in to the nightclub of hell, where he meets "The Prince of Darkness" (Tommy Lee) and parties with him and the other souls there. After receiving a note with an address, Wentz and Hurley meet up with a secret informer from the inside, who explains who kidnapped them and their agenda. She presents Wentz with a bass-neck sword and Hurley with a drum crossbow. Hurley has a substantially long make out scene with the woman before they head off to the clan's headquarters. Trohman is abruptly taken up a flight of stairs by two mysterious women, while Stump is released by police to the Vixens.

=== Rat-a-Tat ===
It is revealed that the Vixens are cult of music-hating women whose goal is to "Silence the Noise." "The Head Bitch in Charge" (Courtney Love) rallies her fellow cult members to destroy various instruments while Wentz and Hurley infiltrate the building in search of Stump and the briefcase. Two of the Vixens drag Stump to a room and strap him down, subjecting him to videos that further his hypnosis to a fully evil state. He is taken to The Head Bitch, who tests his music-hating abilities, which he successfully passes by destroying instruments. Wentz and Hurley finally find Stump, the leader of the cult, and the briefcase. Wentz escapes with the briefcase but Hurley's throat is sliced by two Vixens while covering for Wentz. The scene ends with Stump chasing after Wentz.

=== Miss Missing You ===
Stump catches up and chases him through a junk yard and a trailer park in a fully black-and-white sequence. After running through and fighting in several homes, they battle head to head outside with people cheering them on. Wentz stabs Stump with his sword, but Stump finishes him off with his hook and then dies from his wounds. The Vixens retrieve the briefcase, while Wentz and Stump lay lifeless in the sand.

=== Save Rock and Roll ===
The Kid returns in the elevator, unsure if Stump is truly evil or not, and sends him to purgatory. His evilness is tested by seeing whether he will murder someone. After refusing to, Stump is taken out of his trance and sent to heaven, where he is met by his bandmates. They all receive communion and meet "God" (Elton John), who presents them with powerful instruments. After performing in heaven, God sends them back to earth to "Save Rock and Roll" and, with their instruments, they transform the cult women back to good. Unfortunately, the briefcase is opened by the evil cult and a demon (that resembles a medieval plague doctor) emerges, who then slays anyone in sight. The movie ends with the Defenders (who are covered in blood) confronting the demon, with Wentz using his power to neutralize the demon and causing its blood to splatter on God.

== Production ==
The Young Blood Chronicles was inspired, in part, by Daft Punk's Electroma (2006). Thematically, the film is intended to convey the "deceit within each of us that we have to uncover in the search for who we truly are."

Release history

Part	Song	Release date	Notes
1	"My Songs Know What You Did in the Dark (Light Em Up)"	February 4, 2013	Featuring 2 Chainz
2	"The Phoenix"	March 24, 2013	
3	"Young Volcanoes"	April 18, 2013	
4	"Alone Together"	July 1, 2013	Featuring Big Sean
5	"The Mighty Fall"	August 29, 2013	Featuring Big Sean
6	"Just One Yesterday"	October 14, 2013	Featuring Foxes
7	"Where Did the Party Go"	December 2, 2013	
8	"Death Valley"	December 24, 2013	Featuring Tommy Lee
9	"Rat a Tat"	March 6, 2014	Featuring Courtney Love
10	"Miss Missing You"	May 21, 2014 (television); May 24, 2014 (online)	
11	"Save Rock and Roll"	May 21, 2014 (television); May 24, 2014 (online)	Featuring Elton John and Courtney Love

== Release ==
The narrative film, comprising all eleven videos, premiered as a 45-minute film on May 21, 2014 on Palladia.

The Young Blood Chronicles was released as a limited edition DVD on July 14, 2014.

== See also ==
- Save Rock and Roll
- Interstella 5555: The 5tory of the 5ecret 5tar 5ystem
