= This City =

This City may refer to:

- This City, a Brighton rave band
- "This City" (Steve Earle song), written for the TV show Treme 2011
- "This City" (Patrick Stump song), 2011
- "This City" (Sam Fischer song), 2019
- "This City", song by Snoop Dogg from Bush 2015
- "This City", a song by Lady Antebellum from Heart Break 2017
- "This City", a location frequently referenced in The Protomen's rock opera
