= This City (Patrick Stump song) =

Single by Patrick Stump featuring Lupe Fiasco

from the album Soul Punk
- B-side: "Saturday Night Again"
- Released: July 26, 2011
- Recorded: 2011
- Genre: Synth-pop; R&B
- Length: 3:32 (remix featuring Lupe Fiasco); 3:40 (album version)
- Label: Island
- Songwriter: Patrick Stump
- Producer: Patrick Stump

Patrick Stump singles chronology
"Clothes Off!!" (2007)	"This City" (2011)	"Deep Blue Love" (2019)

Lupe Fiasco singles chronology
"Out of My Head" (2011)	"This City" (2011)	"I Don't Wanna Care Right Now" (2011)

"This City" is a song by American musician Patrick Stump from his debut solo album Soul Punk (2011), released on Island Records. A remix featuring rapper Lupe Fiasco was released as the album's first single (despite the album being a pure solo effort). After finishing his album, Stump decided to re-write Soul Punk after coming up with "This City".

The remix was first uploaded to YouTube for streaming on June 28, 2011, and was later made available for download on iTunes and other digital retailers on July 26, 2011, and that version has been sent out to radio with some commercial success. An accompanying music video for it has been released. The single peaked at No. 2 on the US Bubbling Under Hot 100 Singles chart, equivalent to No. 102 on the Billboard Hot 100.

The Soul Punk version was included on Spin magazine's Lollapalooza mixtape (2011) for free download in the wake of Stump's performance at the music festival in Chicago. Stump has performed the song at his concerts, at radio interviews and on his guest TV appearance on Good Morning New Orleans. The remix of "This City" was included as a bonus track on both standard and deluxe editions of Soul Punk as part of his label's idea.

== Background ==
In January 2010, Stump announced that he was making his debut solo album, titled Soul Punk. This came after Fall Out Boy (his main band)'s hiatus in late 2009. His album is a complete solo effort as he did everything: performing, composing all music, penning all lyrics, playing over ten instruments and producing, with the album being self-funded. Its musical direction is generally pop/R&B orientated and has been described by Stump as "soul punk" and "smart pop," drawing influence from a wide scope of artists including Prince, Michael Jackson and David Bowie. According to Stump, the song changed the entire course of Soul Punk. "I had written a while draft of the album and then at the 11th hour came up with "This City," I really loved the song but felt like, conceptually, it didn't fit on the album. I had to go back and make an album for that song because I loved it so much. So one of the holdups on [the album] was re-writing the record around [it]." With Soul Punk originally due in February 2011, Stump delayed it to October 18 and rebuilt the album with the song, releasing Truant Wave EP in the meanwhile for its delay in February 2011. "I had this feeling that the album was disjointed, and right before I was mastering, I played "This City" for my manager — I really liked it, but I was unsure about it, although I thought it was what I wanted to say — and he was like, 'Put it on, it's great! Then I thought, 'Well, if I'm going to put that on the record, then I really need to go back to the drawing board.' Basically I took "This City", "Everybody Wants Somebody", "Allie", and a song called "Dance Miserable", and rebuilt the album around those four songs."

The song is written in E Major and later modulates to F Major for the closing chorus.

== Remix ==
On Tuesday, June 28, Stump premiered the remix of his Soul Punk track "This City" which features rapper and fellow Chicagoan Lupe Fiasco on avclub.com, linked to his YouTube upload. The remix of "This City" was released as a bonus track on both standard and deluxe editions of Soul Punk as part of his label's idea. Stump said his relationship with the rapper goes back several years. "Before Food & Liquor came out he and I were talking about working on something together. I ended up producing the song "Little Weapon" for his The Cool record," he said. "I actually wrote the hook for "This City" with him in mind before I decided to use it for Soul Punk, so when the label asked me if I'd be interested in doing a remix with an MC he was the only real way I'd say yes." He also added "I'm kind of pop but a little left of center, It sounds kind of like it makes sense on the radio but at the same time doesn't at all. It's very me." Becky Bain of Idolator commented on the song's "full-on R&B mode [...] pop-synth explosion" and noted that the "catchy tune [is] more soul than punk".

The remix was later released as Soul Punk's first single as a digital download to iTunes on July 26, 2011 was also available as the iTunes "Free Single of the Week" from August 26 for seven days. With this exposure, Stump's Truant Wave EP re-entered the Top 100 albums on iTunes. With airplay from Top 40 radio stations, the song has been steadily rising on the charts and became Stump's first charting single. "This City" (remix) debuted at No. 33 on Billboard's Pop Songs chart the week of September 24, over a month after its digital availability. The following week it rose to a new peak of No. 31, then rose to No. 30 the next and entered the Heatseekers Songs at No. 17. After that, it placed at No. 27 on Pop Songs (fourth week), and at No. 16 in its second Heatseekers Songs week. The subsequent week of October 22 saw a new peak at No. 25 on Pop Songs and No. 14 on Heatseekers Songs. The week of October 29 saw the remix drop to No. 29 on Pop Songs in its sixth week, with radio play declining, however it rose to its Heatseekers peak of No. 13 that week, its fourth on that chart. The week after, also Soul Punk's debut, it again fell to No. 32 on Pop and down to No. 17 on Heatseekers. In the US iTunes Store, the remix peaked inside the Top 100 songs chart when it was released and re-entered the Top 100 when the music video came out. About.com ranked "This City" featuring Lupe Fiasco No. 10 on their Top 10 Hot Pop Songs chart for the week ending September 6, 2011.

=== Music video ===
A music video for the remix has been released, directed by Ken Koller. On September 13, Patrick Stump announced that the music video for "This City" (remix) would premiere on September 20 on Vevo with a teaser on Idolator. Prior to that he Tweeted about the video in the making and a behind-the-scenes clip was reported by MTV on their website. The video features Stump dancing and performing the song in a room with flashing lights, projections and heavy use of special effects, alternating with brief grayscale flashes of a city. Despite not being available at first, Lupe Fiasco appears for one scene by himself. Stump and Koller made the video simplistic to let the music do the talking rather than the video.

"There's not really a plot, there's not really a story to it. The song's called 'This City,' and it describes a lot of these images in a city, and I feel like those images are already there; it would be kind of redundant to take a camera into a city; it's almost like the colors and the lights and the images that are going to be around this are going to be representing the life in a city. One thing that Ken and I were talking about is that a city is so complicated, so ... we wanted to do something a bit different with it, and a bit more abstract [...] the treatment was really funny to look at; it was literally one sentence, like 'Patrick stands in a room and sings and we project all these images and lights on the walls.'" -- Stump, reported by MTV.

== In other media ==
- The news station in Houston, Texas, KRIV uses the song for their Fox 26 For Life promos.
- NHL team the Vegas Golden Knights used the song in a hype video for the 2018 Stanley Cup playoffs.
- The NBA's Charlotte Hornets feature the song in a pregame hype video played before every home contest.
- The song is included and recorded in Simlish on the soundtrack of the game's expansion pack, The Sims 3: Showtime.

== Charts ==
=== Weekly charts ===
Chart (2011)	Peak position
US Billboard Bubbling Under Hot 100 Singles	2
US Billboard Heatseekers Songs	13
US Billboard Pop Songs	25
