= The Phoenix (Fall Out Boy song) =

Single by Fall Out Boy

from the album Save Rock and Roll
- Released: March 24, 2013
- Recorded: 2012–2013
- Genre: Dance-punk
- Length: 4:04
- Label: Island
- Songwriters: Patrick Stump; Pete Wentz; Joe Trohman; Andy Hurley
- Producer: Butch Walker

Fall Out Boy singles chronology
| "My Songs Know What You Did in the Dark (Light Em Up)" (2013) | "The Phoenix" (2013) | "Alone Together" (2013) |

Music video
- "The Phoenix" on YouTube

"The Phoenix" is a song by American rock band Fall Out Boy for their fifth studio album Save Rock and Roll (2013). The song was written by the band in collaboration with Butch Walker, who handled production. After being released to digital outlets on March 24, 2013, in advance of the album's release, "The Phoenix" was made available to radio on July 16, 2013, as an official single. The song charted for 1 week, then fell off. An accompanying music video was also released as part of the ongoing series The Young Blood Chronicles, serving as a prequel to the video of the album's lead single "My Songs Know What You Did in the Dark (Light Em Up)".

"The Phoenix" contains elements of Russian composer Dmitri Shostakovich's Symphony No. 7 in C major. Prior to its official release as a single, the song debuted at number 80 on the United States Billboard Hot 100 on the strength of digital sales and also charted in several other countries, including Australia, Canada and the United Kingdom. It won the Kerrang! Award for Best Single in 2013.

== Composition ==
The song was inspired by Soviet Russian composer Dmitri Shostakovich and drum loops, both of which Stump was interested in at one point in the recording process. While listening to the fourth movement (Allegro non troppo) of Shostakovich's Symphony No. 7, Stump became entranced by a certain string moment and proceeded to build an entirely new song influenced by it. The same orchestral snippet was employed as a sample by German hip-hop artist Peter Fox in his 2008 single Alles neu. The tempo of the song is 138 BPM, and it is written in the key of E minor.

== Music video ==
"The Phoenix" is the second of eleven videos in The Young Blood Chronicles series. This video follows that of "My Songs Know What You Did in the Dark (Light Em Up)" and precedes "Young Volcanoes."

=== Video synopsis ===
The music video depicts macabre action scenes of kidnapping, torture, and severing of a hand.

== Charts ==
=== Weekly charts ===
Weekly chart performance for "The Phoenix"
| Chart (2013) | Peak position |
|---|---|
| Australia (ARIA) | 86 |
| Canada Hot 100 (Billboard) | 73 |
| Finland Download (Latauslista) | 6 |
| Ireland (IRMA) | 72 |
| New Zealand (Recorded Music NZ) | 40 |
| Scotland Singles (OCC) | 28 |
| UK Singles (OCC) | 36 |
| UK Rock & Metal (OCC) | 1 |
| US Billboard Hot 100 | 80 |
| US Hot Rock & Alternative Songs (Billboard) | 14 |
| US Rock & Alternative Airplay (Billboard) | 49 |

=== Year-end charts ===
Year-end chart performance for "The Phoenix"
| Chart (2013) | Position |
|---|---|
| US Hot Rock Songs (Billboard) | 44 |

== Certifications ==
Certifications for "The Phoenix"
| Region | Certification | Certified units/sales |
|---|---|---|
| Brazil (Pro-Música Brasil) | Gold | 30,000^{‡} |
| New Zealand (RMNZ) | Gold | 15,000^{‡} |
| United Kingdom (BPI) | Gold | 400,000^{‡} |
| United States (RIAA) | 2× Platinum | 2,000,000^{‡} |
^{‡} Sales+streaming figures based on certification alone.

== Release history ==
Release dates and formats for "The Phoenix"
| Country | Date | Format | Label |
|---|---|---|---|
| United States | July 16, 2013 | Modern rock radio | Island Records |

== In popular culture ==
This song is used in the gameplay trailer of the wrestling video game WWE 2K14.

In 2023, it is used in South Korea's Terra commercial.
