= Truant Wave =

EP by Patrick Stump
- Released: 22 February 2011
- Genres: R&B; synth-pop; alternative rock; pop rock
- Length: 24:13
- Label: Nervous Breakdance Media
- Producers: Patrick Stump; Om'Mas Keith

Patrick Stump chronology
Truant Wave (2011)	Soul Punk (2011)

Professional ratings
Review scores
Source	Rating
Hit the Floor	4/5 stars
Rolling Stone	3/5 stars

Truant Wave is the first EP by the American musician Patrick Stump, the lead singer and guitarist of Fall Out Boy. It was first released as a digital download exclusive to iTunes on February 22, 2011, through Stump's own record label Nervous Breakdance Media, before becoming available from all online retailers on 9 March. It was announced on Stump's website a week before its release date, with little lead up and "absolutely zero promotion" and was unexpected by fans as Stump had never made any mention of it.

It is his second release as a solo artist, the first being his "Spotlight (New Regrets)" and "Spotlight (Oh Nostalgia)" 7" vinyl. Truant Wave was an advance of the release of his first full-length album, Soul Punk, and consists of songs that Stump did not include on it. Soul Punk was released on October 18, 2011. On June 9, he made Truant Wave available on a 12" vinyl, also through his own label and made available on his web store. He felt the EP to be "[kind of] a concept album."

== Background ==
After Fall Out Boy's hiatus in late 2009, Stump embarked on a solo side project. His first solo album, Soul Punk, was tentatively scheduled for release in February 2011, with Stump saying in November 2010, "the album should be out in February [2011] and as can be inferred from the long delay, it's changed dramatically from the album I alluded to a year ago [...] As for the delay of the album itself, I'd say it's been less about the music or recording and more about all the other things that finish the thought, I just want to make sure I go to sleep at night knowing I'm not half-assing this." However, in February 2011 there was no album release lead up, and Truant Wave was released instead on February 22 after Stump announced it the week before, with no promotion or lead up.

"Formal album releases take so much time to prepare, so I’d like to announce the release of Truant Wave, a digital EP I’ve put together of songs I felt strongly about but didn’t have place for within the narrative of Soul Punk. "Having recorded Soul Punk as the sole performer and writer, creating Truant Wave also presented a welcome opportunity for me to work with some of my gifted friends on my solo material."

Of the songs in the 6-track digital EP, three feature guest artists, while the rest are solo material. "Spotlight (Oh Nostalgia)" was first heard on the internet on 29 November 2010, along with "Spotlight (New Regrets)". Stump had a poll asking voters which version they would prefer to see on Soul Punk, his upcoming album, which was closed in February 2011 and the results hidden. Although "Spotlight (Oh Nostalgia)" was ahead in the poll before it was hidden, Stump decided to put "Spotlight (Oh Nostalgia)" on Truant Wave, claiming that the votes were too close and that he felt as if "Oh Nostalgia basically needed its own record", building Truant Wave around it. "As Long As I Know I'm Getting Paid" and "Love, Selfish Love", two tracks included on the EP, were both played at Stump's performance at South by Southwest (SXSW) in 2010 and as acoustic versions at Stump's live Rolling Stone performance. On Twitter, he mentioned that the songs he had debuted at South by Southwest in 2010 would not be on Soul Punk, but would still receive a "proper release", which is now known to be Truant Wave.

== Music ==
Stump commented that "most of the lyrics on this record are written in character, not as myself".

Stump does not go back to his pop-punk roots, and says Truant Wave is not Take This to Your Grave Part II as some people expected. Instead, the EP features his new style: electronic-leaning, R&B-teasing jams. He says that one of the reasons he put out Truant Wave in the first place was to "soften the blow" of his new music style, because it was a major change from Fall Out Boy's sound. "I really want Soul Punk to have as much of a chance to have it be listened to discerningly," he laughed. "And if I'm going to disappoint people by not [making] Take This to Your Grave, Part II, I would rather do that before Soul Punk, because that record means something to me." "I had way too much material. ... A lot of it didn't make sense on the record, but it still felt like something, so I made a little mini-record out of them, and it sort of became a concept record for me. So for all those reasons and more, I decided, 'Screw it, I'm going to put this out.' "

Stump referred to his EP as "a bit of a concept record". "It's not as strict a concept album in that I don't have a narrator or epic space battles or anything like that. It's pretty bare-bones and it works as a pop record," he said. "Basically, I took this idealistic, naive little character, and at the beginning of the record, he has the best intentions, the highest hopes, and, as you get towards the middle of the record, he's just such an a--hole. And then the character gets really dark, and then, at the end, I envisioned him being really down and out in Hollywood, like drunk and telling someone, 'Look, kid, don't make the same mistakes I did.' ... It has a narrative, but it's not like I named the characters or know anything about these things."

Stump is happy with his EP's reception. "I told people about this record a week ago, two weeks ago, there was no promo, no press, nothing, so, for it to do as well as it has, it's definitely gratifying," he said. "In the back of my head, there's always this little voice that's like, 'Just don't blow it,' and so far, so good, you know?"

He premiered "Explode" on YouTube and a remix of "This City" featuring rapper Lupe Fiasco was available on iTunes in the lead up to Soul Punk's release.

== Packaging and title ==
The cover artwork was designed by Stump's friend, Aakash Nihalani. Of the origin of the title, Truant Wave, Stump said, "I was thinking about the suffix “Wave”, and all of these scenes that have been saddled with it. “New Wave”, “No Wave”, “Chill Wave”, etc. I feel like the music I make has never really fit in anywhere. It’s the same reason I named the album Soul Punk, I’m neither because I’m both. So in that same way I feel like whatever scene I’m a part of hasn’t shown up yet."

== Promotion ==
"Spotlight (New Regrets)" 7" vinyl was the first release by his record label, Breakdance Media record. It was yellow and limited to a 500 pressings, with "Spotlight (New Regrets)" and "Spotlight (Oh Nostalgia)" as a Double A-side. It was available through his online store. "Spotlight (Oh Nostalgia)" was used in The Vampire Diaries in the episode "The Last Dance".

On 28 February 2011, Stump's first music video as a solo artist, "Spotlight (Oh Nostalgia)", was premiered on the internet. The slow motion, low-budget video directed by Joe Wein shows Stump as he interacts with people and animals doing extraordinary things and showcasing their talents; pogoing, skateboarding, sport stacking, yo-yoing, penspinning and swinging nunchucks. On April 4, 2011, it was the "video of the day" on fuse.tv.

In February/March 2011, Stump released a "Love, Selfish Love" 7" vinyl for sale in his webstore. It has "Love, Selfish Love" on the A-side and "As Long As I Know I'm Getting Paid" on the B-side. It is limited to 500 pressings on 100% recycled random colored vinyl. The artwork was by Roland Tomayo.

On June 9, Stump released Truant Wave as a 12" vinyl, a "180 gram neon green vinyl pressing" for sale through his webstore. This release was also without any promotion, with only a picture of the vinyl he uploaded to the social networking site Twitter a few weeks earlier.

== Track listing ==
All lyrics are written by Patrick Stump except "Cute Girls" co-written with Om'mas Keith; all music is composed by Patrick Stump.

No.	Title	Length
1.	"Porcelain" (featuring Alph-a-Bit)	4:34
2.	"Spotlight (Oh Nostalgia)"	4:02
3.	"Cute Girls" (featuring Om'mas Keith)	3:30
4.	"Love, Selfish Love"	3:53
5.	"As Long as I Know I'm Getting Paid"	3:42
6.	"Big Hype" (featuring D.A. of Chester French and Driis)	4:32

== Personnel ==
- Patrick Stump – vocals, drums, percussion, guitars, bass, piano, keyboards, trumpet, trombone, synthesizer
- Matthew Rubano – bass on "Porcelain"
- Alph-a-Bit – additional vocals on "Porcelain"
- Om'mas Keith – MPC3000, Wurlitzer, Roland Juno 106, and Moog Voyager on "Cute Girls"
- Iman B – backing vocals on "Cute Girls"
- Scott King – Siel DK 600, Alesis D6 Andromeda, and Dave Smith Tetra on "Cute Girls"
- Max Drummey – string arrangement for "Big Hype"
- Songa Lee – violin on "Big Hype"
- Mario de Leon – violin on "Big Hype"
- Dane Little – cello on "Big Hype"
- D.A. Wallach – additional vocals on "Big Hype"
- Driis – additional vocals on "Big Hype"

== Charts ==
Chart (2011)	Peak position
US Billboard 200	67
US Billboard Rock Albums	17
US Billboard Alternative Albums	11
US Billboard Independent Albums	7
UK Independent Breakers Albums	4
