= Alone Together (Fall Out Boy song) =

Single by Fall Out Boy

from the album Save Rock and Roll
- Released: August 6, 2013
- Recorded: October 2012 – March 2013
- Studio: Rubyred Recordings, Venice, California
- Genre: Power pop; pop
- Length: 3:23
- Label: Island
- Songwriters: Pete Wentz; Patrick Stump; Joe Trohman; Andy Hurley
- Producer: Butch Walker

Fall Out Boy singles chronology
"The Phoenix" (2013)	"Alone Together" (2013)	"Young Volcanoes" (2013)

Music video
- "Alone Together" on YouTube

"Alone Together" is a song by American rock band Fall Out Boy from their fifth studio album Save Rock and Roll (2013). It was released to American mainstream radio as the album's third overall single and second mainstream radio single on August 6, 2013.

== Composition ==
The song has been described by critics as a power pop and pop song.

== Music video ==
The official music video is part of the Young Blood Chronicles, a musical film produced by the group featuring each song from the album. The story continues with Stump tied in a chapel, Hurley in a room with headphones on, forced to listen to horrible music, Wentz in a room with women taking pictures of him, and Trohman on a stage with kids throwing rotten food at him. Wentz escapes by seducing his way out. He then takes a woman's hook off her hand to kill her while the others are tortured by their captors. During his escape attempt, he rescues rapper Big Sean. When Wentz passes Stump, he puts the hook on Stump's arm stump. Wentz is quickly recaptured shortly after. Stump is electrocuted, although he is implied to have become "evil" after his procedure. With Big Sean watching nearby, the four band members are then brought to the van.

== Live performances ==
The band has played the single on The Today Show on July 19, 2013, and used the first verse as a lead on to "My Songs Know What You Did in the Dark (Light Em Up)" during an America's Got Talent guest appearance. On October 10, 2013, Fall Out Boy performed "Alone Together" on American talk show The Ellen DeGeneres Show. They also played the song during the fifth-season finale of the Australian reality singing competition The X Factor on October 28, 2013, after their Save Rock and Roll Australian tour. Following the X Factor performance, the single debuted at number 40 on the Australian ARIA Singles Chart—the band's 11th entry on the chart—while Save Rock and Roll re-entered the albums chart at number 25. On November 19, Fall Out Boy was televised on Jimmy Kimmel Live! for the second time that year and played "Alone Together" and "My Songs Know..." (the latter for the second time on the show). During the 2013 Macy's Thanksgiving Day Parade, the band performed "Alone Together" on the Teenage Mutant Ninja Turtles float, with the Turtles dancing along and gesturing when the crowd was to "say yeah" as directed in the song.

== Commercial performance ==
"Alone Together" debuted on the Billboard Pop Songs chart in mid-October and cracked the U.S. Billboard Hot 100 week ending December 14, 2013, after spending a few weeks on the Bubbling Under Hot 100. On April 10, 2014, "Alone Together" was certified Gold by the RIAA and was upgraded to Platinum in November 2015 for 1 million units.

== Remixes ==
- Alone Together (Krewella Remix)
- Alone Together (Jump Smokers Remix)

== Charts ==
=== Weekly charts ===
Chart (2013–14)	Peak position
Australia (ARIA)	40
UK Singles (Official Charts Company)	81
UK Rock & Metal (Official Charts)	1
US Billboard Hot 100	71
US Hot Rock & Alternative Songs (Billboard)	11
US Dance Club Songs (Billboard)	9
US Pop Airplay (Billboard)	21
Venezuela Pop Rock General (Record Report)	10

=== Year-end charts ===
Chart (2013)	Position
US Hot Rock Songs (Billboard)	57

Chart (2014)	Position
US Hot Rock Songs (Billboard)	32

== Certifications ==
Region	Certification	Certified units/sales
United Kingdom (BPI)	Silver	200,000^{‡}
United States (RIAA)	2× Platinum	2,000,000^{‡}
^{‡} Sales+streaming figures based on certification alone.

== Release history ==
Region	Date	Format	Label
United States	August 6, 2013	Contemporary hit radio	Island Records
United Kingdom	August 19, 2013	Contemporary hit radio	Island Records
