= Patrick Stump =

American musician and songwriter (born 1984)

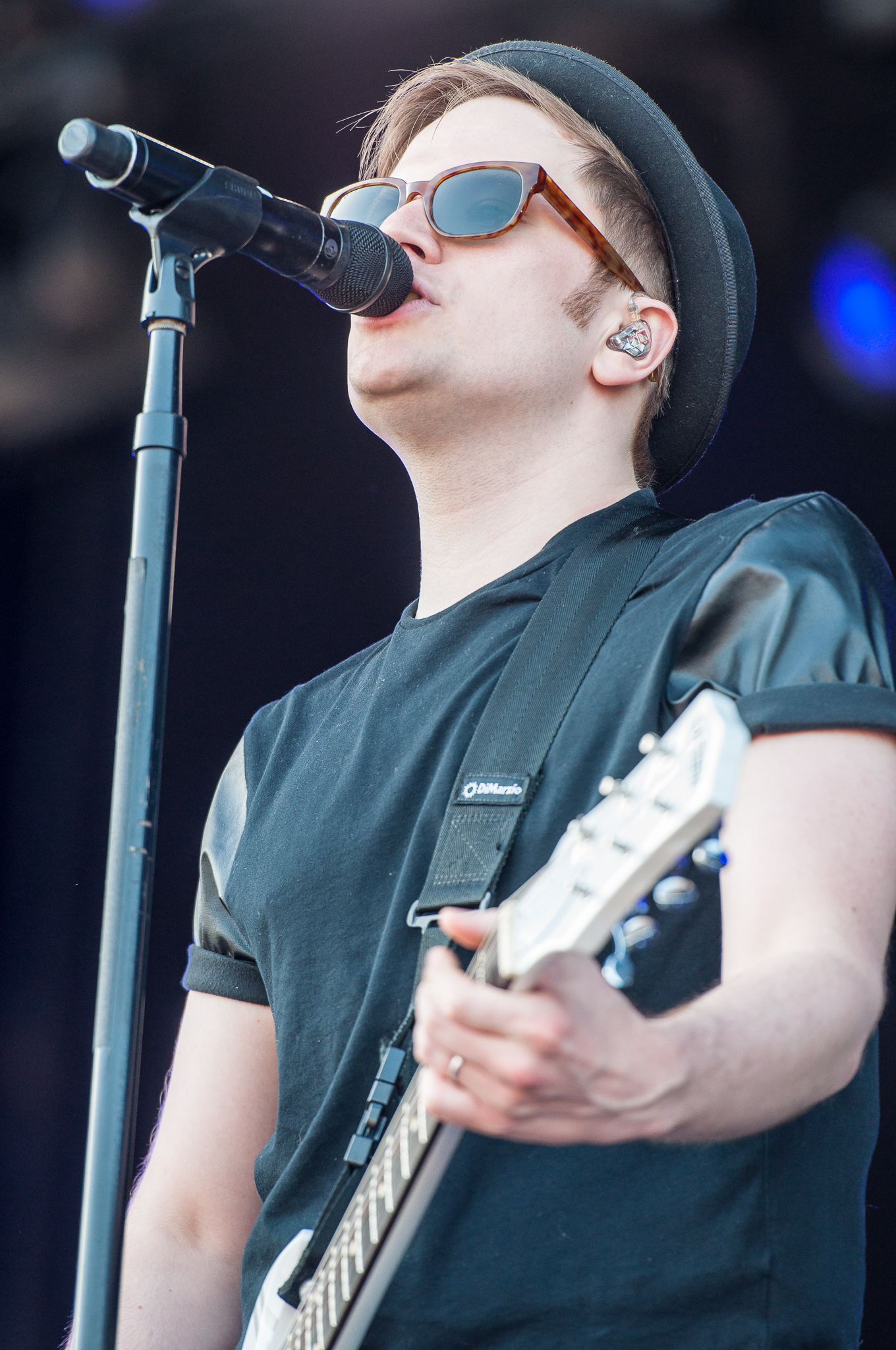
- Stump performing with Fall Out Boy in 2014

Background information
- Born: Patrick Martin Stumph; April 27, 1984 (age 42); Evanston, Illinois, U.S.
- Genres: Pop-punk; pop rock; alternative rock; soul; R&B; pop; emo; emo pop; synth-pop
- Occupations: Singer; songwriter; musician; record producer; actor
- Instruments: Vocals; guitar; piano; keyboards; bass; drums; percussion
- Years active: 2001–present
- Labels: Island; Nervous Breakdance Media
- Member of: Fall Out Boy
- Formerly of: Arma Angelus
- Spouse: Elisa Yao (m. 2012)
- Children: 2
- Website: falloutboy.com

Patrick Martin Stumph (born April 27, 1984), known professionally as Patrick Vaughn Stump, is an American singer, songwriter, musician, and record producer. He is the lead vocalist and guitarist of the rock band Fall Out Boy, originally from Glenview, Illinois.

His solo work has been described as "funky and R&B infused", while Billboard noted him as "one of the best voices in pop-punk". Fall Out Boy has achieved four top ten singles on the US Billboard Hot 100 and four number one albums on the Billboard 200, firstly with Infinity on High (2007), followed by and including Save Rock and Roll (2013), American Beauty/American Psycho (2015), and Mania (2018). With Pete Wentz, Stump founded the record label DCD2 Records in 2005, through which he has signed and worked in production for musical acts including Cobra Starship, Gym Class Heroes, and Panic! at the Disco.

After Fall Out Boy's hiatus in late 2009, Stump released his debut solo album, Soul Punk, on October 18, 2011. It was preceded by the extended play, Truant Wave (2011). He toured in the US and Europe in support. The band returned from hiatus in February 2013 with the album Save Rock and Roll, and the EP PAX AM Days (2013).

== Early life ==
Stump was born in Evanston, Illinois, to David, a folk singer, and Patricia (née Vaughn) Stumph, an accountant. He is the youngest of three children. He grew up in Glenview, Illinois, and attended Glenbrook South High School. His parents divorced when he was eight years old. He was raised Catholic.

He originally played the drums in various local Chicago power violence and hardcore punk bands, including Public Display Of Infection, Xgrinding processX, Patterson, and, for two shows, Arma Angelus. His musical idols growing up included Michael Jackson, Elvis Costello, Tom Waits, and Nat King Cole.

== Career ==
=== Fall Out Boy (2001–2009; 2013–present) ===
Fall Out Boy's founding guitarist Joe Trohman met Stump over a mutual musical interest, and introduced Stump to bassist Pete Wentz. After originally auditioning as the drummer, Stump became the lead singer and later guitarist for the band. Trohman and Stump switch between lead and rhythm guitar in recording sessions and at live shows, although Stump views himself as more of a rhythm guitarist because of his drumming background. He is the lead vocalist, guitarist, and primary composer for the band, with bassist Pete Wentz taking lyrical duties. The band's first mini-LP, Fall Out Boy's Evening Out with Your Girlfriend, was released in March 2003 on Uprising Records. They then released their first full-length album, Take This to Your Grave on Fueled by Ramen on May 6, 2003. In the same year, Stump decided to professionally drop the "h" in his surname to reduce mispronunciations.

In 2003, Stump and his fellow band members went on to sign with Island Records, and released the acoustic-based EP My Heart Will Always Be the B-Side to My Tongue CD and DVD in 2004 to hold fans over while the group recorded their major label debut. The EP debuted at No. 153 on the Billboard 200, Fall Out Boy's first entry on that chart (their next entry week would be at No. 9 with From Under the Cork Tree). It also peaked at No. 5 on the Billboard Heatseeker Albums and No. 10 on the Billboard Independent Albums. This was followed by their third studio album, From Under the Cork Tree released on May 3, 2005, which was the band's mainstream breakthrough. It has since been certified double platinum by the RIAA, with a sales total of more than 2.5 million. It debuted and peaked at No. 9 on the Billboard 200, becoming the band's first top-10 album. The chart-topping lead single "Sugar, We're Goin Down" reached No. 8 on the Hot 100 and received heavy airplay rotation at Pop and Alternative radio. The album's second single, "Dance, Dance", also enjoyed mainstream success, peaking at No. 9 on the Hot 100 and becoming Fall Out Boy's second top-10 hit. It won various awards and was certified platinum. The band heavily toured in 2005 and 2006 in support of From Under the Cork Tree, including headlining Warped Tour, the Nintendo Fusion Tour, and the Black Clouds And Underdogs tour, as well as playing a secret show under the name of Saved Latin at a small venue. Fall Out Boy was nominated for the Best New Artist Grammy Award in 2005.

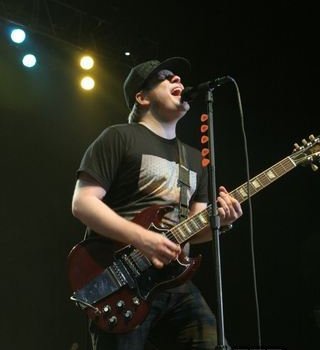
Stump performing with Fall Out Boy in 2006

Fall Out Boy's third studio effort, Infinity on High, was released to major chart success in 2007. It debuted at No. 1 on the Billboard 200 chart with 260,000 sales, becoming the group's first No. 1 album and second top 10 release. It also debuted atop other various Billboard charts and charted in the top five worldwide. Infinity was spurred on by the lead single, "This Ain't a Scene, It's an Arms Race", which hit No. 2. "Thnks fr th Mmrs", the second single from the album, peaked at No. 11. Fall Out Boy toured all year worldwide in support of it, with arena gigs in the US.

Folie à Deux was released on December 10, 2008. Its sales were less than stellar in comparison to Infinity on High, but gave the band its third consecutive top 10 album, debuting and peaking at No. 8 on the Billboard 200 with 150,000 opening week sales. The lead single, "I Don't Care", landed at No. 21 on the Hot 100 and went Platinum. The band was the opening act for Blink-182's reunion tour in 2009. They released their first greatest hits album, Believers Never Die – Greatest Hits, later that year, featuring all of their previous single releases, two new songs, including the single "Alpha Dog", and two rarities. In late 2009 the band took an indefinite break to "decompress", with the band members embarking on various side projects, with Stump going solo, Trohman and Hurley forming heavy metal supergroup The Damned Things, and Wentz starting the electropop/experimental group Black Cards.

On February 4, 2013, Fall Out Boy unexpectedly announced their return. April 12 of the same year, the band released a new album entitled, Save Rock and Roll, a new song, "My Songs Know What You Did in the Dark (Light Em Up)", and dates for a new tour. The band played their first show in over three years on the night of February 4 in Chicago. Save Rock and Roll peaked at No. 1 on the Billboard 200, selling 154,000 copies in its first week, becoming the band's 4th consecutive top 10 album. With Fall Out Boy, Stump toured heavily throughout 2013 and 2014 on the album, selling out arenas worldwide, with bands such as Paramore on the Monumentour. In October 2013, they released a new EP, PAX AM Days which they recorded in a two-day session with producer Ryan Adams.

Sixth studio album American Beauty/American Psycho was released to become the band's third Billboard 200 No. 1 album, debuting with 192,000 first week sales and 218,000 equivalent album units. The album was preceded by the triple Platinum top 10 single "Centuries". "Uma Thurman" was released to mainstream radio on April 14, 2014, and peaked at 22 on the 'Billboard' Top 100, and were certified as Platinum in August 2015.

In April 2017, Fall Out Boy released "Young and Menace", the lead single for the seventh studio album. The band's seventh album Mania was officially released January 19, 2018 and debuted at number one on the Billboard 200, making it the band's third consecutive and fourth chart-topping debut overall.

On August 23, 2018, the band released an EP called Lake Effect Kid. The EP includes a new version of a demo, with the same name, from the band's 2008 mixtape, CitizensFOB Mixtape: Welcome to the New Administration.

In September 2018, Fall Out Boy headlined Wrigley Field in the band's hometown of Chicago, marking a milestone in their career as their first headline show at a stadium.

On December 7, 2018, Fall Out Boy received their second Grammy nomination for Best Rock Album for MANIA.

=== Solo career (2010–2012) ===
In January 2010, Stump announced he was working on a self-written, performed and produced solo album. Later during that year he leaked the title of Soul Punk, which was eventually released on October 18, 2011.

Stump explained that he named the album Soul Punk because he wanted to contribute to the musical vernacular of both. "I'm just as pissed off as I was while screaming in punk bands, but I feel like I'm directing it into something positive and centered around love." He created a video on his website that shows him playing numerous instruments, starting with drum kit then adding more such as synthesizer, cowbell, electric guitar and bass, amongst others. He performed new songs at his debut solo performance at SXSW 2010 in Austin, Texas, including "As Long As I Know I'm Getting Paid" and "Love, Selfish Love", which may have originally been from an earlier version of his solo album, but have since been included as a part of his solo debut EP, Truant Wave.

On November 29, 2010, Stump put up on his website two different versions of his debut song, "Spotlight", one called "Spotlight (Oh Nostalgia)", and the other "Spotlight (New Regrets)", with download links for both. Stump expressed that after months he still could not decide which version he liked better and asked his fans to vote on a poll for the version of the single they liked better and wanted to have on the album. The polls closed leaning toward "Spotlight (Oh Nostalgia)", however Stump has since decided to include "Spotlight (New Regrets)" on Soul Punk and put "Spotlight (Oh Nostalgia)" on his debut EP, Truant Wave, claiming that the votes were too close and that he felt as if "Oh Nostalgia basically needed its own record", building Truant Wave around it.

He released the first EP of his solo career, Truant Wave, digitally on February 22, 2011, through his own record label, Nervous Breakdance Media. The EP consisted of songs Stump "felt strongly about but didn't have place for within the narrative of Soul Punk" and featured Alph-A-Bit, Om'mas Keith of Sa-Ra, David-Andrew "D.A." Wallach of Chester French, and Driis.

On April 6, 2011, Stump contributed an original song, entitled "Saturday Night Again" to the album Download To Donate: Japan Tsunami Relief.

A month later, on May 6, 2011, he updated his website and also posted to his Facebook and Twitter, announcing "I feel like I'm gonna explode 5.9.11" with a link which led to a video called "Tsar bomba", which was a video of a bomb explosion. The "I feel like I'm gonna explode" phrase came from his song "Explode", which Stump premiered at his live show and ended up on Soul Punk. "Explode" was released on May 9, 2011. NyMag.com commented that the song is "heavily indebted to Michael Jackson and, in good news for FOB loyalists, not totally unlike Stump's old band". The song's video caption read "Soul Punk: coming late Summer". On June 27, 2011, Stump wrote on his Facebook and Twitter page, "Tuesday". The next day (the Tuesday he was referring to), Stump released a remix of a Soul Punk track, "This City", featuring rapper Lupe Fiasco. On July 26, the remix was released as the album's first single to iTunes.

Stump played twelve small shows around the United States in support of Soul Punk and Truant Wave. He visited Chicago, Boston, Philadelphia, New York, Los Angeles, and San Francisco. The tour began on April 3, 2011, in Chicago and ended on April 15 in California. It was his first tour as a solo artist. Shows were also scheduled in London (2 dates); Paris and Cologne. His five-piece backing band consists of bassist Matt Rubano (formerly of Taking Back Sunday), guitarist Michael Day, keyboardist/saxophonist Casey Benjamin (who has performed with Mos Def and Q-Tip), and drummer Skoota Warner. With the addition of Janice Cruz Brooks singing background vocals for the New York City shows at Joe's Pub. He performed in a sleek black tuxedo, white moon boots and fingerless leather gloves, and on some songs he played the electric guitar. His setlist varied from show to show, and premiered new songs "Explode", "Allie", "Cryptozoology" and "Everybody Wants Somebody" which turned out to be Soul Punk tracks. Covers performed included "Cupid's Chokehold" by Gym Class Heroes, "All of the Lights" by Kanye West, "Kiss My Sass" by Cobra Starship, "Me and Mrs. Jones" by Kenny Gamble and Leon Huff, and "Nothing Compares 2 U" by Prince. He played songs from Truant Wave as well as "Spotlight (New Regrets)" which he previously released as a 7" vinyl.

In May 2011, Stump was the opening act for Bruno Mars and Janelle Monáe on their "Hooligans In Wondaland Tour" for four shows. He began his second US tour (first full-length headline tour) August 3, 2011. Prior to that he performed at Fuji Rock Festival in Japan on July 30. As part of his US tour he played Lollapalooza in Chicago. He announced a month-long US fall tour in support of Panic! at the Disco, beginning on October 9. After the tour, he headlined the Metro in Chicago. He has been a guest at many radio shows. His TV guest appearances include Good Morning New Orleans, The Tonight Show with Jay Leno, and Hoppus on Music.

In a blog post in February 2012 after disappearing from the internet, Stump mentioned that he would halt performing. He stated that the relentless criticism he has received from Soul Punk and Fall Out Boy's latest release, Folie à Deux, felt like "some big cosmic sign that says I should disappear" and that although he was prepared for criticism, he was not prepared to accept that people who ostensibly supported something he was involved in would turn into "haters" and attack his ambition and slimmed down image. He went on to write "It's tempting to say I won't ever play/tour/record again, but I think that's probably just pent up poor-me emotional pessimism talking."

On May 20, he returned to blog and offer an explanation of his lack of updates and his music career. Confirming by saying: "I won't ever quit music, I just may not release some of my own for a little bit" and that he may tour to support Soul Punk in the future. He says that in the last 6 months of going silent he has taken acting classes and co-written and collaborated with other musicians. These collaborations include: Escape The Fate, Kat Graham, Amountboyz, The King Blues, All Time Low, Before You Exit, and Yellowcard.

As of February 2013, Soul Punk has sold 23,000 copies in the US.

On November 30, 2014, when asked if another solo album would be made, Stump responded, "There's hope but it will be a minute."

On July 18, 2016, Stump won Best Vocalist at the 2016 Alternative Press Music Awards for his efforts in Fall Out Boy.

In 2025, Stump appeared on ska band Catbite's EP, Doom Garden. The song he appears on, "Tired of Talk", was released on March 26.

== Music projects ==
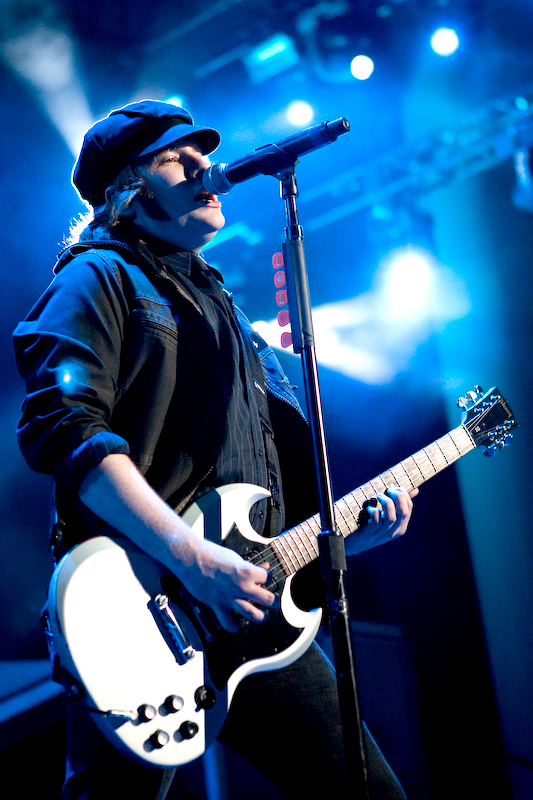
Stump performing with Fall Out Boy in 2007

As a producer, along with a handful of Fall Out Boy tracks, Stump has worked with the Hush Sound on Like Vines, Gym Class Heroes on As Cruel As School Children and Cobra Starship on ¡Viva la Cobra!. He also produced the song "Little Weapon" on Lupe Fiasco's The Cool. He was featured in a song by hip-hop group the Roots originally intended for their 2008 album Rising Down. In 2008, he executive- and co-produced the Cab's Whisper War and Gym Class Heroes' The Quilt, as well as several tracks on Tyga's No Introduction.

In addition to producing albums, Stump has also remixed various tracks for soundtracks or special releases. Among various others, he made a "Queen Of Apology" remix for The Sounds on the Snakes on a Plane soundtrack, a remix of the Fall Out Boy single "Dance, Dance" available on the "Sugar, We're Goin' Down" EP, a "Sugar, We're Goin Down" remix on Fall Out Boy's From Under the Cork Tree special edition release, and "Pace Yourself" for The Higher on their album, On Fire. He also remixed Good Charlotte's "Little Things" for their remix compilation, Greatest Remixes.

On February 1, 2009, Gretsch released the G5135CVT-PS Patrick Vaughn Stump Signature Series "STUMP-O-MATIC" Electromatic® CVT, based on their model body with personal stylings by Patrick Stump such as a "kill switch" and stripes. Also, Stump signed and gave away two of his signature guitars that he used to record Fall Out Boy's fifth album, Folie à Deux. He has another Stump-O-Matic with white and silver stripes, which he used for most of the guitar recording on Soul Punk and at his solo concerts.

Stump appeared as a guest with Daryl Hall from Hall and Oates on Live From Daryl's House, playing guitar on several of Hall and Oates' own songs, as well as on a couple of Fall Out Boy selections, such as "Sugar, We're Goin Down" and "I Don't Care" and, additionally, performing as a drummer/vocalist on a version of "What a Catch Donnie."

During the production of Soul Punk, Stump contributed a cover of Buddy Holly's "Everyday" to the 2011 tribute album, Listen to Me: Buddy Holly to a positive reception. Victoria Asher provided backing vocals. Stump and the album's contributing artists performed at the tribute event at the Music Box Theater.

On September 23, 2012, Stump contributed lead guitar and vocals for a performance of "Black Hole Sun" with Robert Glasper Experiment at the London iTunes Festival. He later contributed vocals to the track "I Stand Alone", on the album Black Radio 2, which premiered September 23, 2013.

He created his own version of the theme song for The CW's TV series, One Tree Hill, featured on the third episode of season 8, "The Space in Between". He provided a song for season 5 episode 3 "Big Trouble in Little Clerks 2" of Adult Swim's Robot Chicken in which he parodied James Cameron's Avatar.

In late 2014, he appeared on reality TV shows The Voice as an advisor and on The Sing-Off.

On November 5, 2015, it was announced that Stump had written and produced a song called Trophy Boy for the soundtrack of the animated film Charming to be sung by High School Musical star Ashley Tisdale, Avril Lavigne and G.E.M.

Stump composed an original ride score for the on-ride audio system for the enhanced Incredible Hulk Coaster, a roller coaster at Islands of Adventure theme park in Orlando, which re-opened on August 4, 2016.

In early 2016, he was revealed to be contributing to Blink-182's fifth studio album, California. Stump was later given songwriting credits on two songs off the album, Sober and San Diego. He also co-wrote "10 Victoria's Secret Angels" for MAX's studio album Hell's Kitchen Angel, who MAX described as 'one of his favorite collaborations'.

Stump has song writing credits on Black Veil Brides frontman, Andy Black's, debut solo album The Shadow Side, contributing to the album's leading single, "We Don't Have to Dance".

In addition to writing for other artists, Stump has been involved in the composition of original scores for a number of films. He scored the music for a short film adaptation of Alice in Wonderland, Wonderland, a comedic take on the classic tale, and worked on the music for Gnome Alone (2018) and the 2019 comedy-drama Changeland.

In September, 2018, Stump announced he'd be the composer for the first feature film, entitled Spell, produced by Crush Pictures, a subsidiary of Crush Management of which Fall Out Boy and Stump are members. Stump stated that the film's score was his real solo album; "I did the solo thing, and I loved making that record [2011's Soul Punk]. But now as a composer, I'm like, 'Oh, this is my solo record. This my real solo record, writing music for films, TV, and stuff.'"

A further composition effort of Stump includes his work on the original score for the 6-part documentary series Let Science Speak, which aims to combat the "escalating efforts to suppress environmental science and silence scientists". On working on the documentary, Stump stated that he was first approached to compose only for the documentary's trailer, but was then asked to compose music for the whole series. Stump explained that composing is something he has always wanted to do, despite not being classically trained.

Stump wrote the theme song and is the composer for 2021 animated television series Spidey and His Amazing Friends on Disney Junior. He has also written songs for the Netflix animated series Dead End: Paranormal Park and composed the music for 2024 Netflix animated series Hot Wheels Let's Race.

Stump composed his first film score with Sick Girl (2023).

== Acting work ==
In January 2008, Stump was a guest star on Law & Order. He appeared in the second episode of Season 18 as Marty Dressler, a lowly employee of an electrical company, who is suspected in the kidnapping of the wife and daughter of an executive. The episode, "Darkness", aired on January 2, 2008, on NBC as part of the two-hour series season premiere. There was a rumor that he was not paid for this episode, but he has debunked that and said that he was paid well for his appearance.

Stump made a short film in 2009, Moustachette which was at film festivals. It stars Stump himself, Pete Wentz, and Yellowcard's Ryan Key. It was released online in September 2011.

Stump guest-starred as a lab technician on an episode of House in the episode "We Need the Eggs" (season 8, episode 17), which aired on April 16, 2012. He also made a cameo appearance in the 2008 film Sex Drive along with his Fall Out Boy bandmates.

Alongside his live-action appearances, Stump has partaken in some voice acting roles, such as a handful of Robot Chicken sketches and providing the voice for the character Ruberiot in the Disney XD cartoon Star vs. the Forces of Evil, where he also provided his vocal talents for the song "The Ballad of Star Butterfly". In 2017, Stump guest starred, with his bandmates, in Cartoon Network's Teen Titans Go! playing himself in the first, third and fourth parts of "The Night Begins to Shine". Their cover of the title song from the special was commercially released.

He has also appeared in The Young Blood Chronicles, Fall Out Boy's eleven-part music video story to support the band's 2013 album Save Rock and Roll with bandmates.

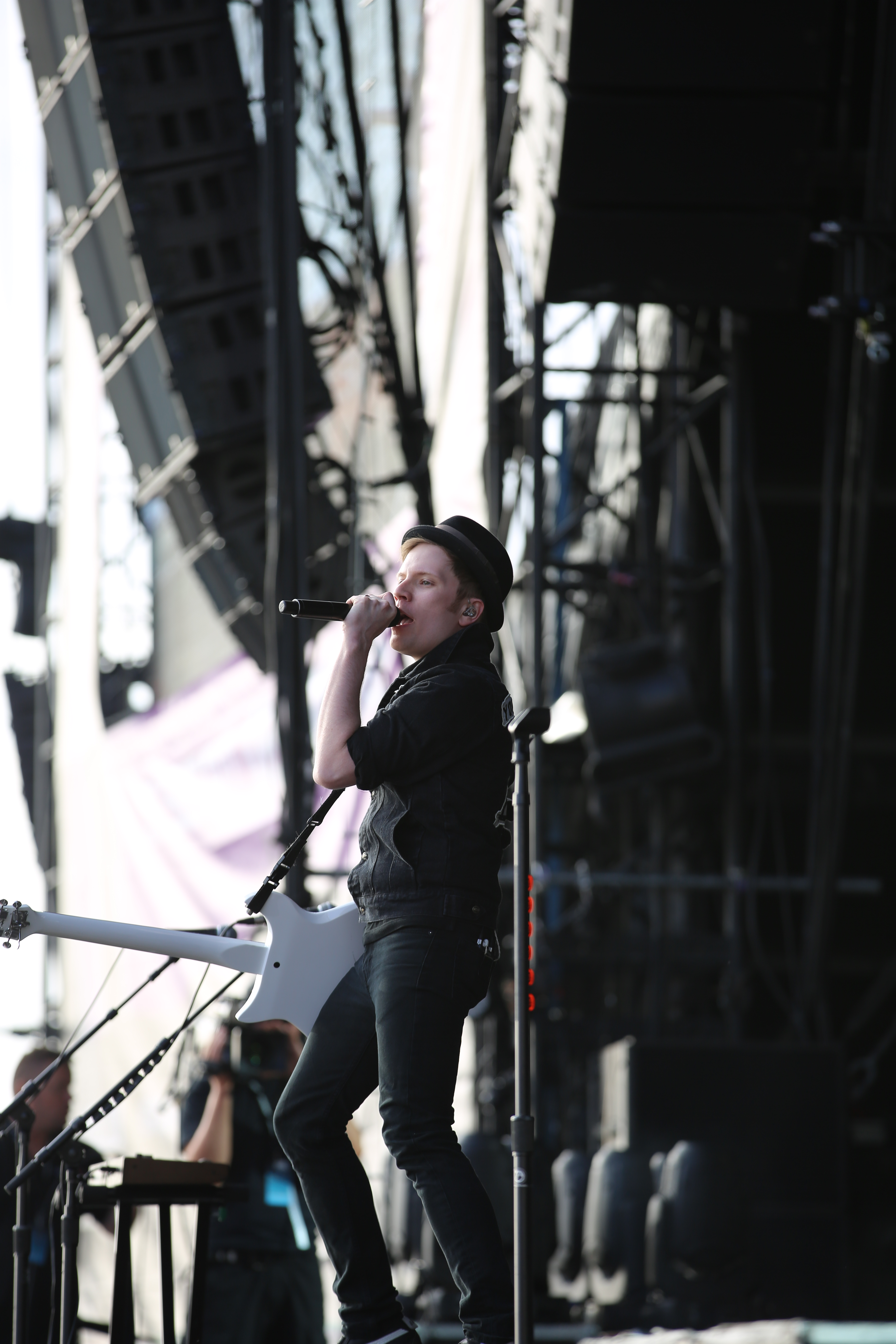
Stump performing in 2014

On July 24, 2025, it was announced that Stump would play Abel, the son of Adam, in the second season of Hazbin Hotel.

== Personal life ==
Stump married his longtime girlfriend, Elisa Yao, in 2012. They live in Chicago together. Stump announced in September 2014 that he and his wife were expecting their first child, and on 13 October their son Declan was born.

Stump has ADHD. He lost 65 pounds (29 kg) when Fall Out Boy went on hiatus, due in part to growing health issues. Stump also has synesthesia, specifically grapheme–color and chromesthesia.

In 2012, Stump was elected a member of the National Academy of Recording Arts and Sciences's Chicago Chapter Governors.

== Artistry ==
Stump occasionally sings in the falsetto register. His vocal style incorporating elements of jazz and blues music.

Some of Stump's major influences are Michael Jackson, Prince, David Bowie, Phil Collins, Peter Gabriel, who are reflected specifically in Soul Punk. Stump's influences also include bands such as The Beatles and Green Day, and artists such as Elvis Costello, John Cage, Marvin Gaye, Nina Simone, Tom Waits, Wolfgang Amadeus Mozart, Ludwig van Beethoven, Sergei Prokofiev, Dmitri Shostakovich, Igor Stravinsky, John Williams, Danny Elfman, Erich Wolfgang Korngold, and Jerry Goldsmith.

== Discography ==
=== Studio albums ===
Studio album, with selected details and chart positions
Title	Album details	Peak chart positions		
Title	Album details	US	JPN	UK
Soul Punk	Released: October 18, 2011; Label: Island; Format: LP, CD, digital download, streaming	47	61	143

=== Extended plays ===
List of extended plays, with selected details and chart positions
Title	EP details	Peak chart positions			
Title	EP details	US	US Rock	US Alt.	US Ind.
Truant Wave	Released: February 22, 2011; Label: Nervous Breakdance Media; Format: Digital download, streaming	67	17	11	7

=== Fall Out Boy ===
- Take This to Your Grave (2003)
- From Under the Cork Tree (2005)
- Infinity on High (2007)
- Folie à Deux (2008)
- Save Rock and Roll (2013)
- American Beauty/American Psycho (2015)
- Mania (2018)
- So Much (for) Stardust (2023)

=== With other artists ===
Year	Song	Contribution	Artist	Album
2005	"Cupid's Chokehold" (#4 Billboard Hot 100)	Vocals	Gym Class Heroes	The Papercut Chronicles
2005	"Everything Is Alright"	Vocals	Motion City Soundtrack	Commit This to Memory
2006	"Second Chances"	Vocals	October Fall	A Season In Hell
2006	"Don't Wake Me Up"	Vocals	The Hush Sound	Like Vines
2006	"One Day I'll Stay Home"	Vocals	Misery Signals	Mirrors
2006	"Queen of Apology"	Remix	The Sounds	Snakes on a Plane: The Album
2006	"伝説の草原"	Remix	Chemistry	Re:fo(u)rm
2007	"If You Could Remember"	Vocals	Damnation A.D.	In This Life or the Next
2007	"One and Only"	Co-wrote/vocals/guitar	Timbaland	Shock Value
2007	"Clothes Off!!"	Vocals	Gym Class Heroes	As Cruel as School Children
2007	"Cupid's Chokehold"	Vocals	Gym Class Heroes	As Cruel as School Children
2007	"King of Wishful Thinking"	Vocals	New Found Glory	From the Screen to Your Stereo Part II
2007	"The City Is at War"	Co-wrote/production/vocals	Cobra Starship	¡Viva la Cobra!
2007	"Guilty Pleasure"	Co-wrote/production/vocals	Cobra Starship	¡Viva la Cobra!
2007	"One Day, Robots Will Cry"	Co-wrote/production/vocals	Cobra Starship	¡Viva la Cobra!
2007	"Kiss My Sass"	Co-wrote/production/vocals	Cobra Starship	¡Viva la Cobra!
2007	"Damn You Look Good and I'm Drunk (Scandalous)"	Co-wrote/production/vocals	Cobra Starship	¡Viva la Cobra!
2007	"The World Has Its Shine (But I Would Drop It on a Dime)"	Co-wrote/production/vocals	Cobra Starship	¡Viva la Cobra!
2007	"Smile for the Paparazzi"	Co-wrote/production/vocals	Cobra Starship	¡Viva la Cobra!
2007	"Angie"	Co-wrote/production/vocals	Cobra Starship	¡Viva la Cobra!
2007	"Prostitution Is the World's Oldest Profession (And I, Dear Madame, Am a Professional)"	Co-wrote/production/vocals	Cobra Starship	¡Viva la Cobra!
2007	"My Moves Are White (White Hot, That Is)"	Co-wrote/production/vocals	Cobra Starship	¡Viva la Cobra!
2007	"Pleasure Ryland"	Co-wrote/production/vocals	Cobra Starship	¡Viva la Cobra!
2007	"Little Weapon"	Co-wrote/production/vocals	Lupe Fiasco	Lupe Fiasco's The Cool
2008	"One of THOSE Nights"	Co-wrote/production/vocals	The Cab	Whisper War
2008	"Bounce"	Co-wrote/production/vocals	The Cab	Whisper War
2008	"That '70s Song"	Co-wrote/production/vocals	The Cab	Whisper War
2008	"I'm a Wonder"	Co-wrote/production/vocals	The Cab	Whisper War
2008	"Birthday Girl"	Vocals	The Roots	Rising Down
2008	"Supersize Me"	Production/vocals	Tyga	No Introduction
2008	"Don't Regret It Now"	Production/vocals	Tyga	No Introduction
2008	"Woww"	Production/vocals	Tyga	No Introduction
2008	"Est. (80's Baby)"	Production/vocals	Tyga	No Introduction
2008	"Guilty as Charged (song)"	Production/vocals	Gym Class Heroes	The Quilt
2008	"Drnk Txt Rmeo"	Production/vocals	Gym Class Heroes	The Quilt
2008	"Like Father, Like Son (Papa's Song)"	Production/vocals	Gym Class Heroes	The Quilt
2008	"Blinded by the Sun"	Production/vocals	Gym Class Heroes	The Quilt
2008	"Catch Me If You Can"	Production/vocals	Gym Class Heroes	The Quilt
2008	"Live a Little"	Production/vocals	Gym Class Heroes	The Quilt
2008	"No Place to Run"	Production/vocals	Gym Class Heroes	The Quilt
2008	"That's What It Takes, Dear"	Vocals	Kristeen Young	Music For Strippers, Hookers, and The Odd On-Looker
2008	"Little Things"	Remix	Good Charlotte	Greatest Remixes
2009	"Open Happiness"	Vocals	Cee-Lo Green, Brendon Urie, Travie McCoy and Janelle Monáe	Coca-Cola Commercial
2009	"You're Not In On The Joke"	Vocals	Cobra Starship	Hot Mess
2010	"Feet Don't Fail"	Vocals	Claude Kelly	N/A
2010	"The Other Side"	Co-wrote	Bruno Mars	Doo-Wops & Hooligans
2011	"The Last Hero"	Vocals	XV	Zero Heroes
2011	"Bummed Out Blues"	Vocals	Murs	Mursworld 2011 Winter/Spring
2011	"All Your Heart"	Vocals	Transit	Listen & Forgive
2011	"Jock Powerviolence"	Vocals	Weekend Nachos	Worthless
2011	"Everyday"	Song Cover	Tribute Album	Listen to Me: Buddy Holly
2012	"Here I Am Alive"	Co-wrote	Yellowcard	Southern Air
2012	"Outlines"	Co-wrote	All Time Low	Don't Panic
2013	"Picture Perfect"	Co-wrote	Escape the Fate	Ungrateful
2013	"Dancing With The Devil"	Vocals	Krewella	Get Wet
2013	"I Stand Alone" (#41 Japan Hot 100)	Vocals	Robert Glasper	Black Radio 2
2014	"Homeless Romantic"	Co-wrote	Itch	The Deep End
2014	"Bottom Of The Glass"	Co-wrote	Itch	The Deep End
2016	"10 Victoria's Secret Models"	Co-wrote	MAX	Hell's Kitchen Angel
2016	"Gibberish"	Remix	MAX	Hell's Kitchen Angel
2016	"Run Away with Me"	Remix	Carly Rae Jepsen	Emotion
2016	"Sober"	Co-wrote	Blink-182	California
2016	"San Diego"	Co-wrote	Blink-182	California
2016	"Talk Too Much"	Remix	COIN	How Will You Know If You Never Try
2019	"Same Drugs"	Vocals	Matt Nathanson	Postcards (from Chicago)
2019	"86 Missed Calls"	Vocals	Man with a Mission	Break and Cross the Walls I
2019	"Summer Days"	Vocals	Martin Garrix and Macklemore	Summer Days
2020	"New Music Sucks"	Vocals	Posehn	Grandpa Metal
2022	"Sound the Alarm"	Co-wrote/Vocals/Guitar/Saxophone/Trumpet/Trombone	Stu Brooks	Sound the Alarm
2023	"Electric Touch"	Vocals/Guitar/Production	Taylor Swift	Speak Now (Taylor's Version)
2025	"Like You"	Vocals	Hazbin Hotel cast	Hazbin Hotel: Season Two (Original Soundtrack)
2025	"Bad with Us"	Vocals	Hazbin Hotel cast	Hazbin Hotel: Season Two (Original Soundtrack)
2025	"When I Think About the Future"	Vocals	Hazbin Hotel cast	Hazbin Hotel: Season Two (Original Soundtrack)
2025	"Hear My Hope"	Vocals	Hazbin Hotel cast	Hazbin Hotel: Season Two (Original Soundtrack)

== Filmography ==
Year	Title	Role	Notes
2006	One Tree Hill	Himself	Episode: "Just Watch the Fireworks"
2006	Saturday Night Live	Himself	Episode: "Natalie Portman/Fall Out Boy"
2008	Law & Order	Marty Dressler	Episode: "Darkness"
2008	Sex Drive	Himself	Film
2009	Moustachette	Eugene Arlington	Film; director, writer
2010	Na Zdorov 'ya	Denver	Short film
2011–2017	Robot Chicken	Various (voice)	4 episodes
2012	House	Micah	Episode: "We Need the Eggs"
2013	90210	Himself	Episode: "Scandal Royale"
2014	The Voice	Himself	Episode: "Live Show Results"
2014	The Sing-Off	Himself / Guest Judge	Episode: "A Special Holiday Event"
2017	Teen Titans Go!	Himself (voice)	3 episodes
2017	Gnome Alone	Alpha (voice)	Film
2017–2019	Star vs. the Forces of Evil	Ruberiot (voice)	7 episodes
2018	Let Science Speak	—N/a	Film: composer
2019	Spell	—N/a	Film: composer
2019	Everybody's Everything	—N/a	Film: composer
2019	The Banana Splits Movie	—N/a	Film: composer
2019	Changeland	Plane Passenger (uncredited)	Film: composer
2020	Cake	—N/a	Composer
2021	Mark, Mary & Some Other People	—N/a	Composer
2021	Black Friday	—N/a	Film; composer
2021–2025	Family Guy	Various (voice)	9 episodes
2021–present	Spidey and His Amazing Friends	Concert Announcer (voice)	2 episodes; composer
2022	Family Guy	Singer	Episode: "The Lois Quagmire"
2022	Dead End: Paranormal Park	Josh (voice)	Composer
2023	Merry Little Batman	—N/a	Film; composer
2024–2025	Hot Wheels Let's Race	—N/a	Composer
2025	Lego Marvel Avengers: Strange Tails	Pyro (voice)	Film
2025–present	Hazbin Hotel	Abel / Hatchet (voice)	4 episodes
2025–present	Bat-Fam	—N/a	Composer
2026	American Dad!	Grim Reaper (voice)	Episode: "Reaper Madness"
2026	Spidey and the Avengers: Halloween Team-Up!	Jack O'Lantern (voice)	TV special
