= Soul Punk =

Studio album by Patrick Stump
- Released: October 18, 2011
- Recorded: 2010–11
- Genres: Soul; R&B; synth-pop; funk; dance-punk
- Length: 46:11
- Label: Island
- Producer: Patrick Stump

Patrick Stump chronology
Truant Wave (2011)	Soul Punk (2011)

Singles from Soul Punk
- 1. "This City (remix)" Released: July 26, 2011

Soul Punk is the debut solo studio album by American musician Patrick Stump, the lead vocalist, guitarist and composer of Fall Out Boy. It was released in the United States on October 18, 2011 through Island Records. Stump's solo project was officially announced in January 2010 and he later revealed his first album's title to be Soul Punk, his first major musical project since Fall Out Boy's hiatus in late 2009. He characterized the lyrics as being "90% metaphors", with lyrical themes dealing with self-belief, corporate greed, innocence and death.

Rolling Stone included Soul Punk in their "Fall Music Preview: The Season's Hottest Albums" and Spin listed it in their "30 Must-Hear Albums of 2011." Soul Punk has had tentative release dates delayed and unconfirmed dates on the internet. Stump originally completed the album in 2010 and had a tentative February 2011 release date but re-did the finished album after coming up with "This City". For the album's delay, in place of it is a digital EP, Truant Wave, containing six songs, three of which he collaborated with other artists, released on February 22, 2011, on iTunes.

A remix of "This City", featuring Lupe Fiasco, was uploaded to YouTube before being released to iTunes and other online outlets on July 26 as the album's first single. Its music video was premiered on Vevo on September 20. Stump revealed the album cover art on September 7, again done by Aakash Nihalani, whom previously did the art for Truant Wave. Soul Punk was also made available as a deluxe edition with additional tracks. The remix of "This City" is included as a bonus track on both album versions. iTunes' album preorders started on September 27 as well as physical CD preorders from Stump's webstore. With preorders from Stump's online store, a package with a lithograph by Roland Tamayo was available.

Soul Punk was released to generally positive reviews by most music critics, with many critics praising Stump's musical direction and songwriting skill, while negative reviews felt the album was too self-indulgent. His sound was compared to Michael Jackson, whom he has cited as a major influence. The album debuted at No. 47 on the Billboard 200 with 9,000 first week sales but fell off the week after, despite its critical reception and promotion.

== Background ==
After Stump's band Fall Out Boy went on an indefinite hiatus in November 2009, he announced a new project in January 2010 through a message on his YouTube video. Again working with Island Records, he produced Soul Punk. Originally having a tentative release date of February 2011, it was delayed to October that year. In its place, Stump released Truant Wave as his first extended play (EP) through his own record label Nervous Breakdance Media digitally on February 22, 2011. Stump originally completed his album in 2010 but started again from scratch to re-build the album around a song called "This City" that he wrote at the eleventh hour because he wanted to include it but felt it didn't fit on the record. His bandmates Trohman and Hurley formed the heavy metal supergroup The Damned Things with members from Anthrax and Every Time I Die, releasing Ironiclast as their debut album in 2010. Wentz formed an electropop/experimental band Black Cards with lead singer Bebe Rexha. Commenting on these musical endeavours, Stump said "when I look at Damned Things, when I look at Black Cards, I feel like those are totally viable, legitimate bands. It’s not some side project full of songs your main band didn’t want, it is its own thing. I think that means it needed to happen."

Soul Punk features no guest artists or other producers, with Stump playing all the instruments himself.

"When it comes to pop music, there's this perception that all you have to do is press a button on your iPad [to get the sounds] but I wanted to make it with love and put a lot into it. A lot of people asked, 'Where did you get the drum sounds?' I played them. 'What synth plug-in was that?' I played all the synths. 'How'd you get that bass tone?' It's a bass. I really wanted to put in the effort, even if people might not notice."

Several track names were released early such as "This City", "Greed" and "Allie". "Neither I nor my music seem[s] comfortably defined by the DIY punk or R&B/hip-hop scenes," Stump said in a press release. Previously announced songs "Love, Selfish Love" and "As Long As I Know I'm Getting Paid" were released on his debut EP, Truant Wave, instead. A remix of "This City" was later released for streaming on the internet and sent to iTunes and radio in the lead up to the album's release.

On November 29, Stump released "Spotlight" on his website in two different versions, "Spotlight (New Regrets)" and "Spotlight (Oh Nostalgia)". He also included download links for both songs. The website viewed a message from Stump saying that he could not decide between the two versions and asked his fans to vote in a poll, also on his website, for the public's preference as to which version should appear on the album. Although "Spotlight (Oh Nostalgia)" was ahead in the poll before it was hidden, Stump since decided to put "Spotlight (Oh Nostalgia)" on Truant Wave, saying that the votes were too close and that he felt as if "Oh Nostalgia basically needed its own record", building Truant Wave around it. "As Long As I Know I'm Getting Paid" and "Love, Selfish Love", two tracks included on the EP, have both been played at Stump's first solo performance, at South by Southwest (SXSW), in 2010 and as acoustic versions at Stump's live Rolling Stone session. On Twitter he mentioned that the songs he had debuted at South by Southwest in 2010 would not be on Soul Punk, but would still receive a "proper release", which is now known to be Truant Wave.

He released a "Spotlight (New Regrets)" 7" vinyl through his Nervous Breakdance Media label, which was his label's first release. It was yellow and limited to 500 pressings, featuring "Spotlight (New Regrets)" and "Spotlight (Oh Nostalgia)" as a Double A-side. It was available through his online store. A music video was released for the "Oh Nostalgia" version. "Spotlight (Oh Nostalgia)" was featured in The Vampire Diaries in the Episode: "The Last Dance".

Stump unveiled a video of him performing "Spotlight (New Regrets)" live on his redesigned website as of December 20, after both "Spotlight" versions reached 100,000 YouTube views the nights before. The clip features Patrick Stump as a "one man band" simultaneously singing and playing multiple instruments, including an electric drum and a synthesizer, in his studio.

On May 6, 2011, Stump updated his website and also posted to his Facebook and Twitter, announcing "I feel like I'm gonna explode 5.9.11" with a link which led to a video called "Tsar bomba", which was a video of a bomb explosion. The "I feel like I'm gonna explode" phrase came from a song called "Explode", which Stump had premiered at a live show. A new song, titled "Explode" was revealed on May 9, 2011, with a message, "Listen to "Explode" off of my upcoming album Soul Punk on Vulture". Vulture was the website that Stump released the song to. NyMag.com commented that the song is "heavily indebted to Michael Jackson and, in good news for FOB loyalists, not totally unlike Stump's old band". The song's video caption read "Soul Punk: coming late Summer", which is Stump's first official announcement to the public regarding Soul Punk's release date. ""Explode" features Stump’s unique, unmistakable vocals and the clever wordplay that was used to be expected from Pete Wentz," Idolator favourably reported. "In addition to kinship with previous tracks from Fall Out Boy, there’s a little Michael Jackson flavor in here, too."

On June 27, 2011, Stump wrote on his Facebook and Twitter page, "Tuesday". The next day (the Tuesday he was referring to) on June 28, 2011, Stump premiered remix of his Soul Punk track "This City" which features rapper and fellow Chicagoan Lupe Fiasco. The remix was released to digital outlets on July 26, 2011, as the album's first single. The original album version will be released on Soul Punk. Stump said his relationship with the rapper goes back several years. "Before Food & Liquor came out he and I were talking about working on something together. I ended up producing the song "Little Weapon" for his The Cool record," he said. "I actually wrote the hook for "This City" with him in mind before I decided to use it for Soul Punk, so when the label asked me if I'd be interested in doing a remix with an MC he was the only real way I'd say yes." He also added "I'm kind of pop but a little left of center, It sounds kind of like it makes sense on the radio but at the same time doesn't at all. It's very me." Becky Bain of Idolator commented on the song's "full-on R&B mode [...] pop-synth explosion" and noted that the "catchy tune [is] more soul than punk". A music video has been made for it and it premiered on Vevo on September 20.

With a few days' lead up on Twitter, Stump announced the release date of October 18, 2011, for Soul Punk and again updated his website.

Stump revealed the cover art on September 7. It was done by Aakash Nihalani, who also did the art for Truant Wave. Soon after, Stump announced the track listing and a deluxe edition with four additional tracks. The remix of "This City" will be included as a bonus track on both versions of the album as part of his label's idea. iTunes' album preorders started on September 27 as well as physical CD preorders from Stump's webstore. There are two options on Stump's online store: a package with a deluxe edition CD with a lithograph by Roland Tamayo is available and limited to 1000 units, of which the first 250 signed by Stump and Tamayo, or a stand-alone deluxe edition CD. Anyone who preorders from his webstore will be entered into a contest where he will record a custom-made version of "Allie" for 20 random people with their name throughout the song. To mark 100,000 fans on Facebook, Stump posted "Allie" onto the internet. Days before the disc was released, he put it up for free streaming in its entirety on Rolling Stone.

== Composition ==
On the themes of the album, Stump expressed that "Soul Punk is less a cohesive narrative as one piece and more individual pieces that dissect a few themes. The album as a whole deals with greed and paranoia and how the two influence each other. The record also deals a bit with innocence and death."

== Release ==
The album was tentatively scheduled for release in February 2011, with Stump saying in November 2010, "the album should be out in February [2011] and as can be inferred from the long delay, it's changed dramatically from the album I alluded to a year ago [...] As for the delay of the album itself, I'd say it's been less about the music or recording and more about all the other things that finish the thought, I just want to make sure I go to sleep at night knowing I'm not half-assing this." However, in February 2011 there was no Soul Punk lead up, and instead Stump's debut EP Truant Wave was released on February 22 after being first announced the week before, with no promotion or lead up. In an interview with Buzznet in April 2011, Stump said "It's not in stone, but I'm hearing late July [2011] for Soul Punk". "Explode", a Soul Punk song Stump uploaded to YouTube had its captions as: "Soul Punk: coming late Summer." In addition, Amazon has stated a release date of September 13. An advanced album review by Alternative Press magazine reported a release date of July 26, 2011. However, Patrick Stump did not confirm or announce this date, contrary to rumor. A remix of the Soul Punk track "This City" was released to iTunes on July 26, with Stump Tweeting, "contrary to rumor, Soul Punk's not coming out July 26th. "This City" will be released on iTunes that day." An article by Universal Music stated an October 2011 release in the US and September 19 internationally. In a radio interview Stump commented that it was up to the label, hearing a possible September 2011 release. On July 18 he Tweeted, "I will announce a release date as soon as I know it. Until then, it's all just rumors," and followed it up the next day with "I don't control the release date." At that time, Stump did not confirm any release dates for Soul Punk, contrary to misconception with many release dates spreading around the internet. On July 25, Patrick Stump officially announced a set release date of October 18, 2011.

== Critical reception ==
Professional ratings
Aggregate scores
Source	Rating
Metacritic	(65/100)
Review scores
Source	Rating
AbsolutePunk	90%
AllMusic	3.5/5 stars
Alternative Press	4/5 stars
The A.V. Club	C
Boston Globe	(Unfavourable)
Chicago Tribune	3/4 stars
Kerrang!	2/5 stars
Rocksound	(8/10)
Rolling Stone	3.5/5 stars
UWM Post	(Unfavourable)
The Washington Post	(Mixed)

Soul Punk received generally positive reviews from music critics. At Metacritic, which assigns a normalized rating out of 100 to reviews from mainstream critics, the album received an average score of 65, based on 12 reviews, which indicates "generally favorable reviews". The album has received mostly positive reviews from critics with general acclaim for Stump playing all the instruments on the record himself, but division over the "Soul Punk" genre. Annie Zaleski, writing for Alternative Press, in a positive four-star out of five review, called the album a "brave, bold statement" and said the album's "pop sensibilities, clever phrasing and tight grooves will please fans." Alter the Press! described it as a "beautiful blend of 80s inspired electro R'n'B with a refreshing moral undercurrent." Chris Droney of Glasswerk was also positive of the album, writing that Soul Punk "hit every expectation with a deafening wallop" and that it deserves "more recognition than most" of the chart music present today.

Rolling Stone gave the album three and a half out of five stars, saying that "Stump is an excellent, nimble singer, but it's his songwriting that makes this one of the most irrefutably catchy albums of 2011."

Andrew Kelham of Rock Sound magazine gave the album 8 out of 10, acknowledging that the album is distinct from the music which Fall Out Boy wrote, although possibly alienating fans. He summarised the album saying: "It’s good – really good – but only if you want it to be."

== Promotion ==
Patrick Stump uploaded a video to YouTube featuring him singing a cappella versions of the five songs nominated for Record of the Year at the 2011 Grammys to a backing track he made himself; which he posted on YouTube on January 19, 2011. "I guess I decided to do the a cappella thing 'cause I've been put down as a musician a few times as 'just a singer,' and I wanted to kind of see how much [of] a musician I could be with just my voice," Stump wrote in an e-mail to MTV News. The YouTube trending video is notable for fans for Patrick Stump's facial expressions and expressive style of singing.

Stump has also performed an a cappella cover of John Legend's "Green Light" and a Michael Jackson a cappella tribute. Stump recorded himself singing a mash-up of Jackson hits, blending "Billie Jean", "Scream", "Man in the Mirror," "Thriller" and other Jackson songs over pre-recorded backing vocals. In October, for the lead up to the album release, Stump released an a cappella of "Everybody Here Wants You" by Jeff Buckley and then a new jack swing tribute a cappella mash-up of Montell Jordan's "This Is How We Do It", Bobby Brown's "Every Little Step", Bell Biv DeVoe's "Poison" and Boyz II Men's "Motownphilly".

On 4 February 2011, Patrick Stump performed a live acoustic set for Rolling Stone. The live session featured songs which were later released on Truant Wave, notably "As Long As I Know I'm Getting Paid", "Love Selfish Love" and "Spotlight". In addition, Stump also played a cover of "Step Right Up" by Tom Waits. Stump performed while playing an acoustic guitar, with the exception of "Step Right Up" in which he had a partner, Matt Rubano (formerly of Taking Back Sunday) playing the bass guitar; who is also the bassist in Stump's backing band for live shows. While he had intended to play the bass himself, Stump was unable to work the drum machine at the rear of the room which he had purchased the previous day. He was forced to compensate for this by clicking his fingers to the beat. In saying "you've got full on acoustic today because of that", Stump suggests that he had intended for drum beats to be playing for each of his previous songs.

=== Tour ===
Stump played a small tour around the United States in cities including Chicago, New York, San Francisco and Boston in support of Soul Punk and Truant Wave in early 2011. On Bruno Mars and Janelle Monáe's Hoologans in Wonderland tour he was the opening act for four shows, and played his second US tour (first full-length headlining tour), beginning on August 3, 2011, and ending September 3, with supporting acts Wynter Gordon and John West. He also played at music festivals in Chicago (Lollapalooza) and Japan (Fuji Rock Festival). Stump supported Panic! at the Disco on their month-long US fall tour, during which he also held some of his own shows, including his headline at the Metro in Chicago, as well playing at various promotional events and radio sponsored shows. To further promote Soul Punk, Stump had an extensive interview schedule and made TV performances on Good Morning New Orleans, The Tonight Show with Jay Leno and Hoppus on Music.

== Track listing ==
All songs written, composed, produced, and performed by Patrick Stump, except on "This City" remix.

No.	Title	Length
1.	"Explode"	3:23
2.	"This City"	3:40
3.	"Dance Miserable"	3:33
4.	"Spotlight (New Regrets)"	3:19
5.	"The "I" in Lie"	4:25
6.	"Run Dry (X Heart X Fingers)" (Contains hidden track, "Cryptozoology")	8:27
7.	"Greed"	4:11
8.	"Everybody Wants Somebody"	4:21
9.	"Allie"	3:38
10.	"Coast (It's Gonna Get Better)"	3:40
Total length:		42:37

Standard edition bonus track
No.	Title	Length
11.	"This City" (remix) (featuring Lupe Fiasco)	3:34
Total length:		46:11

Deluxe edition bonus tracks
No.	Title	Length
12.	"Bad Side of 25"	5:24
13.	"People Never Done a Good Thing"	3:07
14.	"When I Made You Cry"	3:49
15.	"Mad at Nothing"	3:50
Total length:		62:21

iTunes and Japanese bonus track
No.	Title	Length
16.	"Saturday Night Again"	3:43
Total length:		66:04

Notes

- "Run Dry (X Heart X Fingers)" contains a hidden message through steganography. This message includes the lyrics for "Cryptozoology", but has certain letters capitalized. When these letters are put in order, they spell out "Reaganomics Failed"
- Inside of the album's lyric booklet, contained within the lyrics of every song in the standard album are white letters scattered throughout the words. If these letters are put together chronologically, they form a sort of "message". It reads: "Fear is killing us, but true love can survive. If we cooperate, we can beat doubt. But first, rebuild trust. Take responsibility. Happiness is still free, though not always apparent when it's right in front of us. So keep calm, it's gonna get better."

== Charts ==
Chart	Peak position
Japanese Albums Chart	61
UK Albums Chart	143
US Billboard 200	47
US Digital Albums	23
