= My Songs Know What You Did in the Dark (Light Em Up) =

2013 single by Fall Out Boy

Single by Fall Out Boy

from the album Save Rock and Roll
- Released: February 4, 2013
- Studio: Ruby Red Studios (Venice, CA)
- Genre: Pop metal
- Length: 3:06
- Label: Island
- Songwriters: Patrick Stump; Pete Wentz; Joe Trohman; Andy Hurley; Butch Walker; John Hill
- Producer: Butch Walker

Fall Out Boy singles chronology
| "Alpha Dog" (2009) | "My Songs Know What You Did in the Dark (Light Em Up)" (2013) | "The Phoenix" (2013) |

Audio sample
- file; help

Music video
- "My Songs Know What You Did in the Dark (Light Em Up)" on YouTube

"My Songs Know What You Did in the Dark (Light Em Up)" is a song by American rock band Fall Out Boy, released as the lead single for the band's fifth studio album, Save Rock and Roll. It serves as the band's first single following the group's three-year hiatus and regrouping in early 2013. The track and its music video were released on February 4, 2013, worldwide and February 5, 2013, in North America, to coincide with the official news of the band's reformation. The song impacted radio on February 19, 2013. The band members felt that the song best represented their album at its core.

The song's title and principal lyric originate from an unrelated 2004 demo by the band. Fall Out Boy performed "My Songs Know What You Did in the Dark (Light Em Up)" on Jimmy Kimmel Live! for the group's first post-hiatus TV performance on February 13 as well as on various TV shows throughout the entire year, and have extensively played it in acoustic version at radio interviews. Lead vocalist and guitarist Patrick Stump performed the song as a guest on singer-songwriter Taylor Swift's Red Tour on July 13, 2013, and Swift guested in turn with Fall Out Boy on Victoria's Secret Fashion Show 2013 on November 13, 2013. The song became a staple at several sports-broadcasting soundtracks that year.

The music video is part one of The Young Blood Chronicles, a series in which a video was eventually recorded for every song on Save Rock and Roll as part of a narrative. "My Songs Know What You Did in the Dark (Light Em Up)" was a comeback success, reaching the two million digital downloads mark in July 2013, being the fourth song by Fall Out Boy to do so, and was certified 3× Platinum by the end of the year. It was named by BBC Radio 1 as one of the "Top 100 Tracks of the Past 5 Years" and No. 1 on Sirius XM Hits 1's best of 2013 countdown. It reached the top 10 on both Pop Songs and Alternative Songs with heavy airplay, and peaked at No. 13 on the Billboard Hot 100 with twelve consecutive weeks in the top 20.

== Composition ==
Sheet music for the song "My Songs Know What You Did in the Dark (Light Em Up)" shows the key of D minor and tempo range of 76 to 80 beats per minute.

== Music video ==
The music video for the song is the first of the Young Blood Chronicles, an ongoing series with the band filming a video for every song on Save Rock and Roll. It begins late at night, with a figure – later revealed to be rapper 2 Chainz – walking away from a black van parked in a forest clearing. He starts a bonfire by pouring gasoline over a wood pile and lighting it up with a match. Two women then exit the van, carrying various musical instruments belonging to Fall Out Boy, among them the band's guitars, a bass, drumsticks and various drums and cymbals, before tossing the items into the fire. The women also throw in amplifiers and Fall Out Boy records such as Take This To Your Grave, From Under the Cork Tree and Live in Phoenix, along with a Fall Out Boy wristband and Fall Out Toy Works comics. 2 Chainz then uses a flamethrower to hasten the incineration process, while the women return to the van and open its rear doors, revealing four hooded, bound men implied to be Fall Out Boy themselves. The camera then closes in on 2 Chainz's face as he holds up a match and stares at the band menacingly, ending the video.

Fall Out Boy's capture is shown in the music video for the following single, "The Phoenix", released on March 25, 2013.

== Critical reception ==
Jon Dolan of Rolling Stone called the song "a big, goofy, stomp-along pop-metal anthem". Jason Lipshutz of Billboard described the song as "a natural evolution of the Fall Out Boy sound," adding also that the song is "muscular in scope and jittery in practice, with rolling chants cresting above Stump's nervous energy." Cassie Whitt of Loudwire called the song a "pop banger". Collin Brennan of Consequence of Sound felt that the song's hip hop-esque beat set "Light Em Up" apart from the band's earlier material.

== Commercial performance ==
Commercially, "My Songs Know What You Did in the Dark (Light Em Up)" debuted on charts worldwide with success, reaching in the top five in the United Kingdom, charts the band has previously received success from with singles like "This Ain't a Scene, It's an Arms Race" and "Thnks fr th Mmrs".

On the U.S. Billboard Hot 100, the song debuted at number twenty-six and number eight on the U.S. Billboard Rock Songs chart; it reached number two on iTunes upon its release with 162,000 first-week sales. In its nineteenth week on the chart, it reached a peak of number thirteen on the Hot 100 and number two on the Rock Songs chart (upon Save Rock And Roll's release). The song has sold over 5 million downloads in the United States as of August 2015, the first song by Fall Out Boy to reach this level. "My Songs Know What You Did in the Dark" has sold over 1,200,000 copies in the UK earning a double platinum certification by the BPI as of 2026.

== In pop culture ==
- The song, interspersed with "All I Do Is Win", is performed a cappella by the antagonists of Pitch Perfect 2 at the climax of the movie.
- The song has been known for appearing in several sporting events including the 2013 NBA playoffs player introductions for the Houston Rockets, the Canadian and American television coverage of the 2013 Stanley Cup playoffs, the Pittsburgh Penguins 2013 commercial, intros for NASCAR drivers Aric Almirola and Justin Allgaier at Bristol Motor Speedway, the opening night of Monday Night Football during the San Diego Chargers vs. Houston Texans game and the MLB 2013 postseason "We Play October" campaign.
- The song was featured in the Xbox One presentation at E3 2013 as part of a montage showing different community creations for the upcoming video game Project Spark.
- "My Song Knows What You Did in the Dark" was featured in the promotional video for the backdoor pilot of The Originals and during the Starz programming lineup.
- The song was featured in the 2013 film Percy Jackson: Sea of Monsters.
- The song was also used during Timber Brown's acrobatic act during the quarter-finals on season 8 of America's Got Talent, the show which Fall Out Boy would later perform the song at with "Alone Together" leading in.
- The song was parodied by Israeli–American musician, comedian and YouTuber Rucka Rucka Ali, as a song focusing on Minecraft, titled "Minecraft Won't Add Inches to Your C**k"
- The song was used for the trailer for Disney's Big Hero 6, a film which featured the band's song "Immortals".
- The song was used for the soundtrack to the video games NHL 15 and Guitar Hero Live, the latter appearing as a playable track.
- The song was used during 2022 PDC Challenge Tour winner Scott Williams’ walk ons.
- The song was used in the video game Fortnite in Fortnite Festival mode.
- The song was used in the series Criminal Minds Season 8 Episode 23 "Zugzwang".
- The song's chorus was used as part of the home run horn and song for the Toronto Blue Jays in the 2025 Major League Baseball season

== Remix ==
A remix, produced by Wonder Arillo, featuring rapper 2 Chainz with a hip-hop sound was released on April 3. It was performed live the month before by Fall Out Boy and 2 Chainz at the beginning of the 2013 NBA slam dunk contest.

== Charts ==
=== Weekly charts ===
| Chart (2013) | Peak position |
|---|---|
| Australia (ARIA) | 30 |
| Belgium (Ultratip Bubbling Under Flanders) | 33 |
| Canada Hot 100 (Billboard) | 19 |
| Canada CHR/Top 40 (Billboard) | 31 |
| Canada Hot AC (Billboard) | 35 |
| Canada Rock (Billboard) | 49 |
| Czech Republic Airplay (ČNS IFPI) | 28 |
| Finland Download (Latauslista) | 12 |
| France (SNEP) | 89 |
| Ireland (IRMA) | 33 |
| Lebanon (Lebanese Top 20) | 6 |
| Netherlands (Dutch Top 40) | 35 |
| New Zealand (Recorded Music NZ) | 13 |
| Scottish Singles Sales (Official Charts) | 2 |
| Slovakia Airplay (ČNS IFPI) | 41 |
| UK Singles (Official Charts) | 5 |
| UK Rock & Metal (Official Charts) | 1 |
| US Billboard Hot 100 | 13 |
| US Adult Pop Airplay (Billboard) | 15 |
| US Pop Airplay (Billboard) | 7 |
| US Hot Rock & Alternative Songs (Billboard) | 2 |
| US Rock & Alternative Airplay (Billboard) | 8 |

=== Year-end charts ===
| Chart (2013) | Position |
|---|---|
| Canada (Canadian Hot 100) | 72 |
| UK Singles (OCC) | 113 |
| US Billboard Hot 100 | 40 |
| US Mainstream Top 40 (Billboard) | 40 |
| US Hot Rock Songs (Billboard) | 7 |
| US Rock Airplay (Billboard) | 20 |

== Certifications ==
Certifications for "My Songs Know What You Did in the Dark"
| Region | Certification | Certified units/sales |
|---|---|---|
| Australia (ARIA) | Platinum | 70,000^{^} |
| Brazil (Pro-Música Brasil) | Platinum | 60,000^{‡} |
| Canada (Music Canada) | 3× Platinum | 240,000^{*} |
| Denmark (IFPI Danmark) | Gold | 45,000^{‡} |
| Germany (BVMI) | Gold | 150,000^{‡} |
| New Zealand (RMNZ) | 2× Platinum | 60,000^{‡} |
| United Kingdom (BPI) | 2× Platinum | 1,200,000^{‡} |
| United States (RIAA) | 9× Platinum | 9,000,000^{‡} |
^{*} Sales figures based on certification alone.^{^} Shipments figures based on certification alone.^{‡} Sales+streaming figures based on certification alone.

== Release history ==
| Region | Date | Format | Label |
|---|---|---|---|
| Worldwide | February 4, 2013 | Digital download | Island |
| North America | February 5, 2013 | Digital download | Island |
