= Guilty as Charged =

Guilty as Charged may refer to:

== Music ==
- Guilty as Charged (Cock Sparrer album), 1994
- Guilty as Charged (Culprit album), 1983
- "Guilty as Charged" (song), a 2008 song by Gym Class Heroes

== Film ==
- Guilty as Charged (film), a 1991 comedy film, directed by Sam Irvin
- Guilty as Charged (action film)

== Other ==
- ECW Guilty as Charged, a professional wrestling pay-per-view event in 1999–2001
- "Guilty as Charged", a storyline in the science fiction comedy webtoon series Live with Yourself!

== See also ==
- Guilt (disambiguation)
