= Instruments played by the Rolling Stones =

The Rolling Stones, an English rock band, have been active since 1962. Originally a counterpoint to The Beatles, the group took influences from the blues, rock'n'roll and R&B. Most of their recordings feature a core of drums, bass, two guitars and a lead vocal, though there have been numerous variations on this in the studio.

== Keith Richards ==
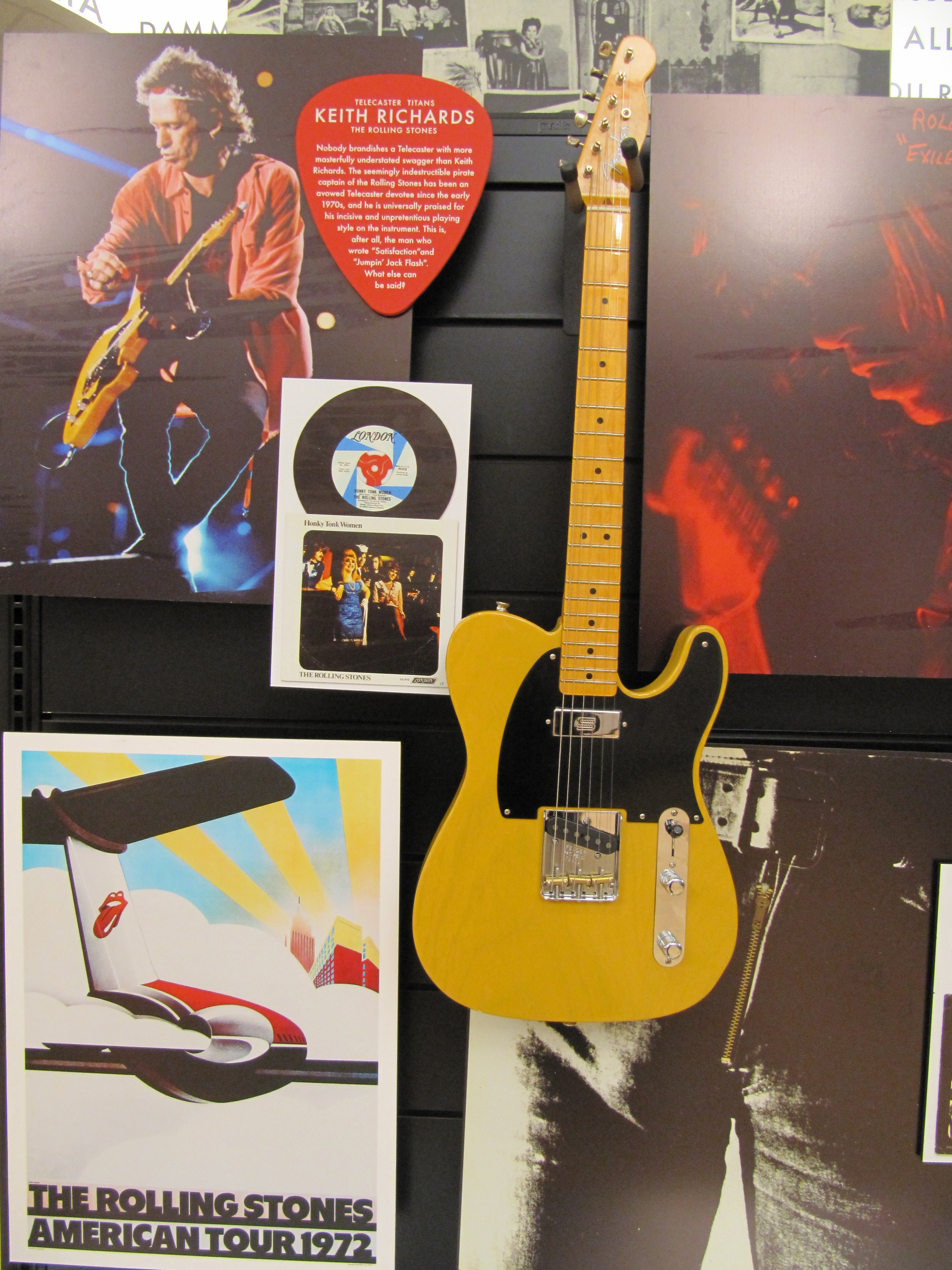
A copy of "Micawber", Keith Richards' signature Telecaster model, in the Fender Guitar Factory Museum

Keith Richards used a Harmony H72 Meteor on early tours, before switching to an Epiphone Casino. After the Stones became successful in the US, Richards acquired a Gibson Firebird and a 1959 Les Paul with a Bigsby Vibrato system. He used this Les Paul live, switching to a Custom model in 1966. Richards' use of the Les Paul in a British rock band helped popularise the model and ultimately lead to production resuming.

In the late 1960s, Richards played a three pickup Les Paul Custom and began to use Fender Telecasters. For The Stones in the Park, he played an Epiphone Casino and a Gibson Flying V. On the late 1969 tour he acquired an Ampeg Dan Armstrong model and he used this during the live recording of Get Yer Ya-Ya's Out!.

From 1970 onwards, Richards began using Telecasters as his main onstage guitar. His favourite model is nicknamed "Micawber" which he received on his 27th birthday (18 December) as a gift from Eric Clapton. Richards replaced the original stock single-coil neck pickup with a Gibson PAF humbucking pickup in 1972.

He used several other Telecasters on tours and in the studio but primarily the Telecaster Custom. The Custom was used on several tours between 1975 and 2008, and Richards was featured in a Fender advertisement promoting the model. From 2003 until 2008 it was used live for songs in Open G tuning, primarily "Jumpin' Jack Flash".

Since 1980, Richards has used other guitars besides the Telecaster, including a Les Paul Junior and Gibson ES-335.

== Brian Jones ==
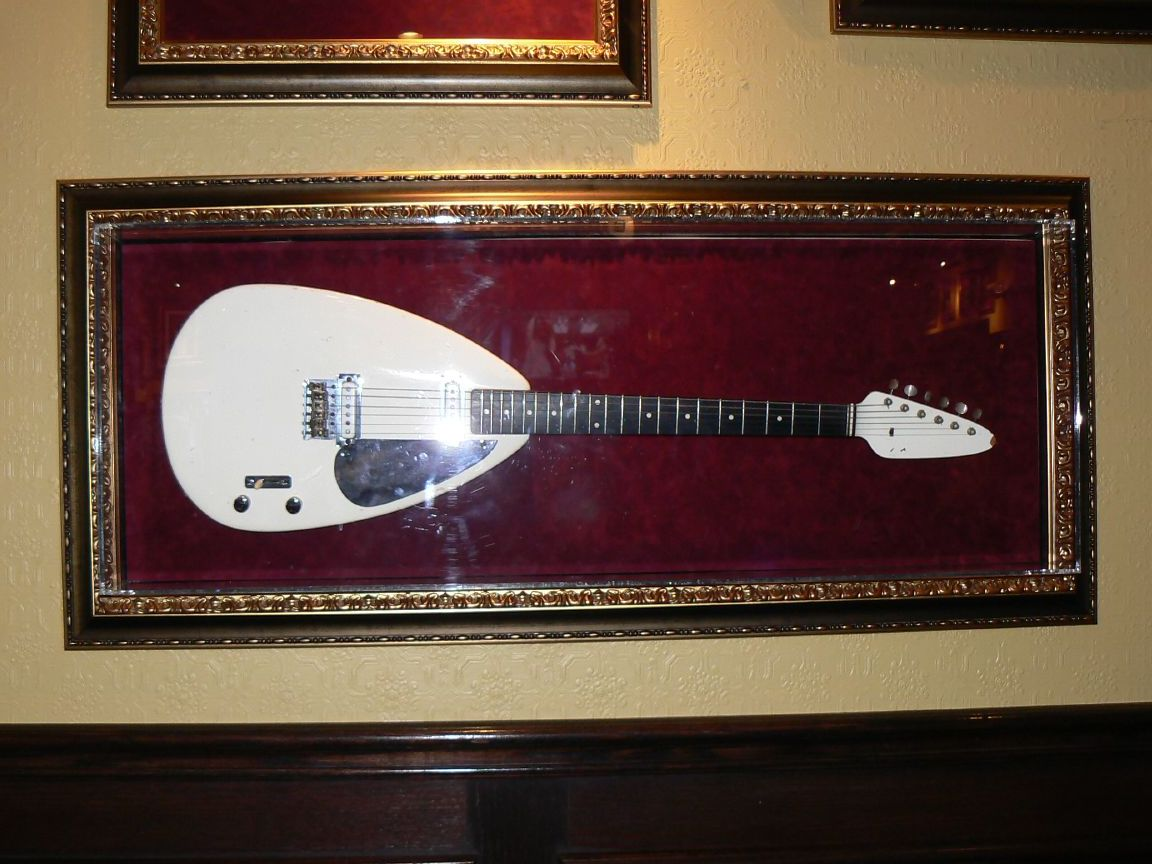
A Vox Teardrop guitar, as used by Brian Jones

=== Guitars ===
Brian Jones used a Harmony Stratotone in the early days of the Stones playing the Blues clubs, replacing it with a Gretsch Double anniversary in two tone green. He used this up until 1965 when he switched to a Vox Prototype Mark IV or "Teardrop" guitar, which is the guitar he is most commonly associated with. He also used a Gibson Firebird, a Gretsch White Falcon, Les Paul, Rickenbacker 360/12 and a Telecaster.

=== Other instruments ===
Jones played the harmonica in the group's early days, and doubled on piano and slide guitar. He played a variety of other instruments, particularly in the studio, including sitar on "Street Fighting Man" and "Paint It, Black", organ on "2000 Man" and "Let's Spend the Night Together", marimba on "Under My Thumb", "Out Of Time" and "Yesterday's Papers", recorder on "Ruby Tuesday", trumpet on "Child of the Moon", Appalachian dulcimer on "I Am Waiting" and "Lady Jane", and oboe and saxophone on "Dandelion".

Jones played the Mellotron on several Stones tracks, including the single "We Love You" and the albums Their Satanic Majesties Request and Beggars Banquet. On his final recordings for the Stones he used an autoharp on "You've Got The Silver".

In the group's early career, Jones sang backing vocals before Richards primarily took over that role.

== Mick Taylor ==
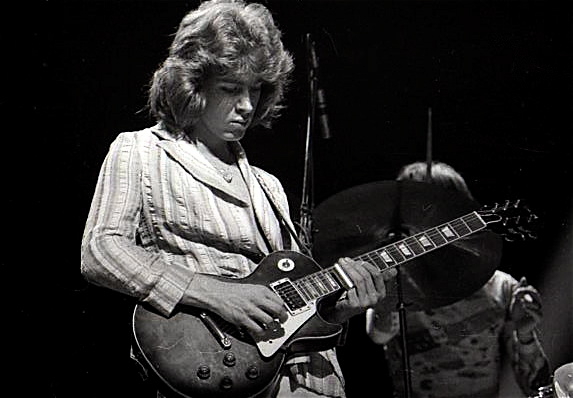
Mick Taylor playing a sunburst Gibson Les Paul on tour with the Stones

Mick Taylor used a Gibson SG for the 1969 Hyde Park gig and the US tour late that year. For most of his time with the Stones, he used a sunburst Les Paul.

== Bill Wyman ==
Bill Wyman had a distinctive way of holding the bass, holding it upright as if to emulate a double bass. In the group's early days he used a Framus Star bass before swapping to a Vox "Teardrop" bass in 1964. From 1967 onward, he alternated between Fender Mustang and Dan Armstrong basses.

== Charlie Watts ==
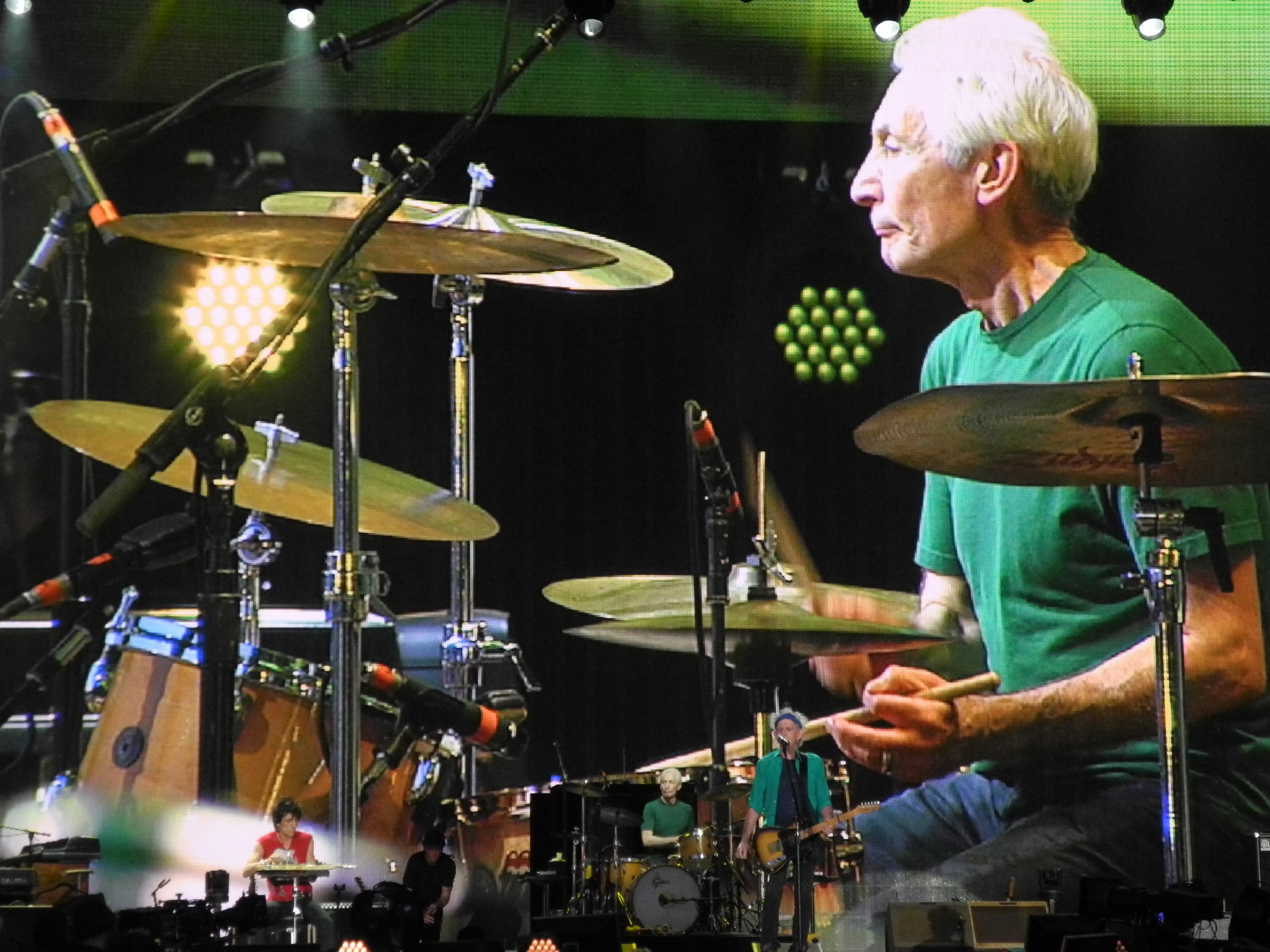
Onstage video of Charlie Watts, showing Gretsch drums and Zildjian cymbals

Charlie Watts' background was primarily in jazz drumming and his choice of drums and setup reflected this style throughout his career. He favored a simple 4-piece drum set and often used a mix of vintage cymbals and hardware that suited his tastes. Though well known as a long-time Gretsch Drums user, he played Ludwig Drums between 1964 and 1968, live and on record.

In the 1960s and 1970s, Watts used a variety of Paiste and Zildjian cymbals before adding in several different UFIP branded examples in the 1980s, most notably a distinctive flat-ride and 'China' cymbal that became signature elements of his sound from thereon. He used Remo drum heads and Vic Firth drumsticks for many years up until his final tour with the band.

Drum Sets

1963-1968 – Ludwig “Super Classic” outfit in “sky blue pearl” finish. 22" bass drum, 13" tom, 16" floor tom with 5x14" “Supraphonic” snare drum. This drum set can be seen in most early live photographs of the band, and is featured prominently during their T.A.M.I. Show performance in 1964.

1968-1969 – Gretsch “Name Band” outfit in “black nitron” finish. 22" bass drum, 13" tom, 16" floor tom with 5x14 Ludwig “Supraphonic” snare drum. This drum set was debuted on the David Frost Show in November, 1968 during the band's performance of Sympathy For The Devil and would later be used on The Rolling Stones Rock and Roll Circus.

1969-1971 – Gretsch “Name Band” outfit in “black diamond pearl” finish. 22" bass drum, 13" tom, 16" floor tom with 5x14 Ludwig “Supraphonic” snare drum. Alternately, Watts also began using a Gretsch chrome over brass 1460 model snare drum during this time as well. This drum set was used at the infamous Altamont Free Concert in 1969, as well as all tours between 1969 and 1971.

1972-1977 – Gretsch “Name Band” outfit in “black nitron” finish. 22" bass drum, 13" tom, 16" floor tom with 5x14 Ludwig “Supraphonic” and Gretsch 1460 snare drums. This drum set differs from his previous 'black nitron' set due to having contemporary “stop sign badges” on the drums in place of the earlier “round badge”.

1978-2019 – The drum set Watts is most often identified with is a late 1950s Gretsch round badge outfit in natural maple finish consisting of a 22" bass drum, 12" tom, and 16" floor tom. Watts purchased this set from a studio rental company in the late 1970s and used it exclusively up until his final performance with the band in 2019. Beginning in the 1990s, Watts would use a variety of boutique and custom made snare drums with this set, most notably by Drum Workshop.
