= Running Riot =

Running Riot may refer to:

- Running Riot (film), South African film 2006
- Running Riot, musical by Douglas Furber 1938
- Running Riot, play by Derek Benfield 1953
- Ein ausschweifender Mensch ("Running Riot", 1929) novel by Hermann Kesten
- Runnin' Riot (band), Belfast punk band named after the Cock Sparrer song
- "Running Riot", single by Cock Sparrer also from albums including Running Riot in '84 1984
- "Running Riot", song by Iron Savior from Megatropolis 2007
