= Patches from the Quilt =

EP by Gym Class Heroes
- Released: July 8, 2008
- Recorded: 2007–2008
- Genre: Hip-hop
- Length: 10:38
- Label: Decaydance, Fueled by Ramen
- Producer: S.A.M. & Sluggo

Gym Class Heroes chronology
As Cruel as School Children (2006)	Patches from the Quilt (2008)	The Quilt (2008)

Professional ratings
Review scores
Source	Rating
AbsolutePunk.net	90% link

Patches from the Quilt is a digital EP released by Gym Class Heroes. It includes the singles "Cookie Jar" featuring R&B singer The-Dream and "Peace Sign/Index Down" featuring rapper Busta Rhymes and one new track that appeared on their album The Quilt, released on September 9, 2008.

== Track listing ==
1. "Cookie Jar" (featuring The-Dream) - 3:35
2. "Peace Sign/Index Down" (featuring Busta Rhymes) - 4:03
3. "Blinded by the Sun" - 3:00
