= The Queen and I (song) =

Single by Gym Class Heroes

from the album As Cruel as School Children
- Released: August 28, 2006
- Recorded: 2005
- Genre: Rap rock, alternative rock
- Length: 3:20
- Label: Decaydance, Fueled by Ramen
- Songwriters: Gym Class Heroes, Sam Hollander, Dave Katz
- Producer: S*A*M & Sluggo

Gym Class Heroes singles chronology
"Cupid's Chokehold" (2005)	"The Queen and I" (2006)	"New Friend Request" (2006)

Gym Class Heroes UK singles chronology
"Clothes Off!!" (2007)	"The Queen and I" (2007)	"Cookie Jar" (2008)

Music video
- "The Queen and I" on YouTube

"The Queen and I" is a song by American rap rock band Gym Class Heroes, released as the first single from their third studio album, As Cruel as School Children (2006).

The song is a more fast-paced song than many other of the group's songs. The song refers to lead singer, Travis McCoy, falling in love with an alcoholic (the "Queen").

"The Queen and I" was a non-chart qualifier in the UK as both physical formats contained a sticker, which is against UK chart rules. The single was re-released in the UK on 29 October 2007, following the top five success of "Cupid's Chokehold" and "Clothes Off!!" there.

This song has been featured in computer games such as Tony Hawk's Project 8 and as an instrumental version on Tiger Woods PGA Tour 08.

== Formats and track listings ==
UK CD:

1. "The Queen and I" (explicit album version)
2. "Ovrigadu, P.A." (non-album track)

7" Vinyl:

1. "The Queen and I" (explicit album version)
2. "Boomerang Theory" (non-album track)

UK re-release CD 1:

1. "The Queen and I" (album version)

UK re-release CD 2:

1. "The Queen and I" (album version)
2. "The Queen and I" (video)

UK re-release 7" Vinyl:

1. "The Queen and I" (album version)
2. "Boomerang Theory"

Australian CD:

1. "The Queen and I" (Album Version)
2. "The Machine and I" (feat. Keith Buckley of Every Time I Die)
3. "Clothes Off!!" (Stress Remix) (feat. Ghostface Killah and Tyga)

== Music video ==
The music video was directed by Shane Drake and starts with multiple men (such as a jester and a wizard) all trying to gain the love of a queen. Each one desperately tries to woo her, each one equally as unsuccessful. Travis McCoy then comes in and tries his luck by rapping for the queen, but he also seems to be unsuccessful. As he leaves, he trips and the queen smiles. She soon changes her mind about him and chases after him. However, when she reaches him, he disappears, leaving only his jacket and his trademark, a toothbrush (he is seen brushing his teeth at some point in almost every video). The video ends with the queen looking very angry and the words "she was to live unhappily ever after" are printed on the last page of a story book (the one opened at the beginning of the video).

== Charts ==
Chart (2006)	Peak position
US Pop Airplay (Billboard)	40

== Release history ==
Release dates and formats for "The Queen and I"
Region	Date	Format	Label(s)	Ref.
United States	August 28, 2006	Mainstream airplay	Lava	
