= The Quilt =

Studio album by Gym Class Heroes
- Released: September 9, 2008
- Genres: Alternative hip hop; alternative rock; alternative R&B
- Length: 58:04
- Labels: Decaydance; Fueled by Ramen
- Producers: Patrick Stump; Cool & Dre; Tricky Stewart; Allstar

Gym Class Heroes chronology
As Cruel as School Children (2006)	The Quilt (2008)	The Papercut Chronicles II (2011)

Singles from The Quilt
- 1. "Peace Sign/Index Down" Released: July 8, 2008; 2. "Cookie Jar" Released: July 8, 2008; 3. "Guilty as Charged" Released: December 1, 2008

The Quilt is the fourth studio album by the American rap rock band Gym Class Heroes, released by Fueled By Ramen/Decaydance on September 9, 2008.

The album, featuring the hit single "Cookie Jar," debuted at number 14 on the Billboard 200 with 32,266 copies sold in its first week.

== Background ==
The Quilt was the follow-up to Gym Class Heroes' breakthrough album As Cruel As School Children. The success of two of the bands hits, "Cupid's Chokehold" and "Clothes Off!!," was partly built on their sampling of other songs: Supertramp's "Breakfast in America" and Jermaine Stewart's "We Don't Have to Take Our Clothes Off," respectively. This led to some skepticism about the band's musicianship. "People thought we got a lot of our credit from using samples and they weren't necessarily our songs," bassist Eric Roberts said.

In part, the band sought to address these perceptions by recording much of The Quilt live. "This was the album where we felt comfortable enough to do that," drummer Matt McGinley said. "But we're not stubborn about being a live band. We do embrace certain programmed elements to make the coolest possible songs we can."

== Music and lyrics ==
The album's title reflects its musical diversity, with its songs forming a "patchwork of sounds, different arrangements (and) real lyrics." "Musically, I think it's a big cocktail of everything that's inspired us over the past two years," lead vocalist Travie McCoy said.

On the song "Like Father, Like Son (Papa's Song)," McCoy reflects on his relationship with his father, drawing parallel to 2Pac's "Dear Mama." McCoy explained to Spin: "My dad was married four or five times, with countless relationships in between. At one point, he was dating 18-year-old girls! But he's my hero. He's a blue-collar dude, but he always supported my art." McGinley's father, who died from cancer in 2001, was also supportive of the band and they would rehearse at his house. McGinley later recalled the difficulty of losing a father at a young age.

Personal loss inspired the song "Live Forever (Fly With Me)," which was spurred by the death of McCoy's cousin, who hanged himself after a bad breakup. McCoy played the sound for his cousin's mother and brother, describing it as an emotional experience. The track featured Daryl Hall of Hall & Oates, one of McCoy's musical idols, who inspired Gym Class Heroes' 2007 Daryl Hall for President Tour.

Another collaboration, Don't Tell Me It's Over," featured a verse by Lil Wayne that criticized online detractors. "Wayne heard it and loved it," says Dre, the song's coproducer. "It came out so dope, we were mad we didn't make his verse 16 bars." However, his verse could not be cleared and was omitted from the album.

== Singles and promotion ==
The first single from the album was "Peace Sign/Index Down" which featured Busta Rhymes. It was followed by "Cookie Jar" featuring The-Dream, which peaked at No. 6 on the UK Singles chart. Music videos for both "Peace Sign/Index Down" and "Cookie Jar" were filmed back-to-back, while "Blinded by the Sun" was issued as a promotional single before the album's release.

"Guilty as Charged" featuring Estelle, was released as a subsequent single. The song was premiered on UK radio November 1, and a music video was shot in Las Vegas.

The song "Home" was featured in the video game Madden NFL 09 without the minute-long introduction. A music video for "Live a Little" was uploaded to YouTube on November 17, 2009.

== Release and reception ==
Professional ratings
Aggregate scores
Source	Rating
Metacritic	(69/100)
Review scores
Source	Rating
AllMusic	3/5 stars
Alternative Press	4.5/5 stars
Blender	3/5 stars
Entertainment Weekly	(B)
RapReviews	(8/10)
Robert Christgau	(dud)
Rolling Stone	2.5/5 stars
Slant	1.5/5 stars
Spin	3/5 stars
USA Today	2.5/4 stars

The Quilt was released on September 9, 2008. The album debuted at No. 14 in the US Billboard 200 chart, selling 32,266 copies in its first week, becoming the group's highest-peaking album on the chart. By October 2009, the album had sold 108,000 copies in the United States.

In the United Kingdom, the album debuted at No. 41 in the UK Albums Chart, even though the second single from the album became their third top ten hit in the UK.

According to the review aggregator Metacritic, The Quilt received "generally favorable reviews" based on a weighted average score of 69 out of 100 from eleven critic scores. Michael Hewlett of the Winston-Salem Journal wrote that McCoy's "battle-rap rhymes ride along rock-edged rhythms that dip also into straight-up hip-hop, reggae, ska and emo. It shouldn't work but it does, a roller-coaster ride of sound that feels at times like a therapy session and at other times like an alcohol-fueled after-party. … In this mish-mash of a CD is a beguiling kind of poetry that pulls in listeners rather than pushes them away. This is a beautiful mess of music."

In a review for RapReviews, Steve "Flash" Juon stated: There are no shortage of dope songs on “The Quilt” to nod your head to lyrically and tap your feet to musically. … you can file 'The Quilt”' right next to your collection of Roots classics – this is a band you should be looking out for both today and in 2011."

== Track listing ==
All tracks are written by Gym Class Heroes (Travis McCoy; Matt McGinley; Disashi Lumumba-Kasongo; Eric Roberts). Co-writers are noted if applicable.

No.	Title	Writer(s)	Producer(s)	Length
1.	"Guilty as Charged" (featuring Estelle)	Patrick Stump	Patrick Vaughn Stump; Bill Lefler^{[a]}	4:00
2.	"Drnk Txt Rmeo"	Stump	Stump; Lefler^{[a]}	3:24
3.	"Peace Sign/Index Down" (featuring Busta Rhymes)	Andre Lyon; Marcello Valenzano; Eddie Montilla; Trevor Smith	Cool & Dre; Gym Class Heroes^{[b]}	4:03
4.	"Like Father, Like Son (Papa's Song)"	Stump; Harry Nilsson	Stump; Lefler^{[a]}	4:16
5.	"Blinded By the Sun"	Stump; Kevin Brereton; Corey Hart	Stump; Lefler^{[a]}	3:00
6.	"Catch Me If You Can"	Stump; Pete Wentz	Stump; Lefler^{[a]}; Disashi Lumumba-Kasongo^{[a]}	5:07
7.	"Cookie Jar" (featuring The-Dream)	Christopher Stewart; Terius Nash; T-Pain	Christopher "Tricky" Stewart; Terius "The-Dream" Nash; Sean Hall	3:36
8.	"Live a Little"	Disashi Lumumba-Kasongo^{[c]}	Stump; Lefler^{[a]}; Lumumba-Kasongo^{[a]}	3:43
9.	"Don't Tell Me It's Over"	Lyon; Valenzano; Montilla	Cool & Dre; Gym Class Heroes^{[b]}	4:11
10.	"Live Forever (Fly with Me)" (featuring Daryl Hall)	Lyon; Valenzano; Montilla	Cool & Dre; Gym Class Heroes^{[b]}	7:08
11.	"Kissin' Ears" (featuring The-Dream)	Stewart; Nash	Tricky Stewart; The-Dream	3:42
12.	"Home"	Andre Lyon; Marcello Valenzano; Eddie Montilla	Cool & Dre; Gym Class Heroes^{[b]}	5:09
13.	"No Place to Run"	Lumumba-Kasongo^{[c]}	Stump; Lefler^{[a]}; Lumumba-Kasongo^{[a]}	3:45
14.	"Coming Clean"	Allen Gordon Jr.; Joel Campbell	Allstar "The Big Beat Maker"	3:00
Total length:				58:04

Notes

- ^{^[a]} signifies a co-producer
- ^{^[b]} signifies an additional producer
- ^{^[c]} signifies lyric and original music credits

Sample credits

- "Like Father, Like Son (Papa's Song)" contains elements of "The Lottery Song", written by Harry Nilsson.
- "Blinded By the Sun" contains elements of "Sunglasses at Night", written by Corey Hart.
- "Cookie Jar" contains elements of "Buy U a Drank", written by T-Pain.

Along with the standard 14-track album, iTunes offered an extended edition for $12.99 that included three "Stressed Out Remix" versions of "Cookie Jar" and "Blinded by the Sun" and music videos of "Peace Sign / Index Down" and "Cookie Jar".

== Personnel ==
Gym Class Heroes

- Travis McCoy – vocals
- Matt McGinley – drums
- Disashi Lumumba-Kasongo – guitar, vocals
- Eric Roberts – bass guitar

Additional musicians

- Dave Cabrera – additional guitar (9, 10, 12), additional bass guitar (9, 12)
- Sal Cracchiolo – trumpet (1, 5, 6)
- Patty Crash – additional vocals (2)
- The-Dream – additional vocals (7, 11)
- Estelle – additional vocals (1)
- Frank Fontaine – tenor saxophone (1, 5)
- Daryl Hall – additional vocals (10)
- Wendell Kelly – trombone (1, 5)
- k-os – additional vocals (5)
- Andre Lyon – background vocals and additional instruments (3, 9, 10, 12)
- Adam MacDougall – B3 (1, 2, 5, 6), clavinet (6), keyboards (8, 13), piano (1, 2), Rhodes (2, 6)
- Patrick Matera – additional guitar (8, 13)
- Eddie "Crack Keys" Montilla – piano (3, 9, 10, 12), organ (12)
- Lindsey Ray – additional vocals (13)
- Busta Rhymes – additional vocals (3)
- Patrick Stump – background vocals (4–6)
- T-Bone – additional bass guitar (10)
- Marcello "Cool" Valenzano – additional instruments (3, 9, 10, 12)

Technical personnel

- Ben Allen – mixing (4, 5, 8)
- Allstar – engineer (14)
- Clinton Bradley – sound design (1, 2, 6, 13, 14)
- Nick Chahwala – engineer (7)
- Shaun Evans – mixing assistant (3, 9, 10, 12)
- Craig "The Regulator" Frank – engineer (1, 2, 4–6, 8, 13)
- Brian "Big Bass" Gardner – mastering
- Christy Hall – production assistant (7, 11)
- Seamus Harte – additional guitar engineer (3, 12)
- Jaycen Joshua – mixing (7, 11)
- Brian Lewandowski – mixing assistant and additional Pro Tools (1, 2, 6, 13, 14)
- Machine – mixing (1, 2, 6, 11, 13, 14)
- Chris "TEK" O'Ryan – additional engineering (11)
- Wyatt Oates – assistant engineer (7)
- Dave Pensado – mixing (7, 11)
- Neal H. Pogue – mixing (3, 9, 10, 12)
- Brian "B-LUV" Thomas – engineer (7, 11)
- Pat Thrall – additional engineering (7)
- Randy Urbanski – mixing assistant (7, 11)
- Gina Victoria – engineer (3, 9, 10, 12)
- Ryan Warden – mixing assistant and additional Pro Tools (1, 2, 6, 13, 14)
- Tyler Winick – additional guitar engineer (3, 12)
- Andrew Wueppner – mixing assistant (7, 11)

== Charts ==
=== Weekly charts ===
Chart (2008)	Peak position
Scottish Albums (Official Charts)	81
UK Albums (Official Charts)	41
UK R&B Albums (Official Charts)	8
US Billboard 200	14
US Top Rap Albums (Billboard)	5
