= New Friend Request =

Single by Gym Class Heroes

from the album As Cruel as School Children
- Released: 2006
- Recorded: 2006
- Genre: Alternative hip hop, alternative rock
- Length: 4:00
- Label: Decaydance, Fueled by Ramen
- Songwriters: Samuel Hollander; David Katz; Disashi Lumumba-Kasongo; Travis McCoy; Matthew McGinley
- Producer: S*A*M & Sluggo

Gym Class Heroes singles chronology
"The Queen and I" (2006)	"New Friend Request" (2006)	"Cupid's Chokehold" (2007)

Music video
- "New Friend Request" on YouTube

"New Friend Request" is a song by American rap rock band Gym Class Heroes, released as the second single from their third studio album, As Cruel as School Children (2006).

== Overview ==
"New Friend Request" was inspired by a true story of how lead vocalist Travie McCoy pursued a woman on MySpace. The song references the social networking site's influence on his romantic life.

The single was released on 23 October in the UK and was the band's second consecutive single to be a non-chart qualifier as both physical formats contained a sticker, which is against UK chart rules regarding promotional pack-ins.

A remix, produced by Hi-Tek, is featured on the soundtrack album Snakes on a Plane: The Album.

== Music video ==
The music video for "New Friend Request" is a MySpace-themed video. It has people that are depicted as "friends" on MySpace, and Travie McCoy has to add friends on his MySpace page. He has trouble finding friends, because most of them have flaws and he is trying to find the perfect ones. At the end, he ends up finding friends and something better—a girlfriend.

== Formats and track listings ==
CD

1. "New Friend Request"
2. "Make Out Club" (live in Pittsburgh)

CD (Remix)

1. "New Friend Request" (radio version remix) featuring Papoose
2. "New Friend Request" (instrumental)

7" vinyl

1. "New Friend Request"
2. "Artwork Etching"
