= Runnin' Riot (band) =

Runnin' Riot are a punk rock band from Belfast, noted for their streetpunk, Oi! sound. The band's name was inspired by Cock Sparrer's first single release. Original vocalist Colin McQuillan died in August 2014 when the band were on tour with Lars Frederiksen's Old Firm Casuals.

The band's releases received critical acclaim from the likes of Uber Rock, Exclaim! and Louder Than War.

== Discography ==
=== Albums ===
- Reclaim The Streets (LP / CD, 1998, Rejected Records)
- Monk's Not Dead (CD, 2000, Rejected Records)
- Built In Belfast (CD, 2004, Bad Dog Records)
- Boots & Ballads (CD, 2009, Deadlamb Records / Dirty Old Man Records / Record Rebellion)
