= Shoot Down the Stars =

Single by Gym Class Heroes

from the album As Cruel as School Children
- Released: May 11, 2007
- Genre: Alternative hip hop, alternative rock
- Length: 3:38
- Label: Decaydance, Fueled by Ramen
- Songwriters: Samuel Hollander; David Katz; Disashi Lumumba-Kasongo; Travis McCoy; Matthew McGinley
- Producer: Patrick Stump

Gym Class Heroes singles chronology
| "Cupid's Chokehold" (2006/2007) | "Shoot Down the Stars" (2007) | "Clothes Off!!" (2007) |

Music video
- "Shoot Down the Stars" on YouTube

"Shoot Down the Stars" is the third single from the album As Cruel As School Children by hip-hop/rock band Gym Class Heroes. The video was uploaded on May 11, 2007, to Fueled by Ramen's YouTube channel.

== Music video ==
The video features a younger version of Travis McCoy portrayed by Princetón of Mindless Behavior, facing the trials and tribulations of school. McCoy is break dancing, but as he walks to class, he gets mugged by some students. In class, a student throws spit balls at McCoy, when McCoy fights back, his teacher notices and makes him put his head against the chalkboard. During recess, McCoy is writing lyrics with the modern day McCoy rapping next to him. The younger McCoy sings with a younger Matt McGinley playing drums, Disashi Lumumba-Kasongo playing a guitar and Eric Roberts joins the band, so they enter a talent show. Four acts perform before the band. A ballerina dances, a magician stirs a magic wand in his hat, a boy makes gestures with his hands and the group of kids that mugged McCoy break dance. The band performs and wins the competition. The video ends with the older and younger versions of the band performing in the school yard.
