= Where Are They Now =

Song

Song by Cock Sparrer

from the album Shock Troops
- Released: 1983
- Recorded: 1982
- Genre: Oi!, Punk Rock
- Length: 2:58
- Label: Razor Records
- Producer(s): Cock Sparrer

"Where Are They Now" is a song recorded by English Oi!/punk rock band Cock Sparrer in 1982, from their album Shock Troops. The lyrics comment on the previous six years of the punk subculture. The song portrays the early years of the punk movement in a negative light, bemoaning the lack of follow-through by the leading figures. It also comments on the band members' own naivete, exhorting listeners to not make the same idealistic mistakes. Its lyrics mention several punk legends. In an interview with the fanzine Schizoipunx from 27 July 2006, Mickey Beaufoy of Cock Sparrer stated:

Julie Burchill and Tony Parsons were rebellious "punk" journalists from the late-1970s. Joe is the late, great Joe Strummer, Jimmy is Jimmy Pursey and Rotten was Johnny Rotten from the Sex Pistols - and the song, which was written in 1982 was about what we saw as the quiet death of Punk - as none of these people were active then - but I am glad to say that the scene has recovered since then - but people still love that song so we keep it in the set as a warning that we have to keep at it or all this great music could disappear.

The lyrics "Rotten on the telly, showing what a few choice words can do" refer to the Sex Pistols' lead singer Johnny Rotten and the Grundy incident, in which Rotten and other Sex Pistols swore on live television, sending Britain into an uproar.

The song has been covered and recorded by Swingin' Utters, Strike Anywhere, Roger Miret and the Disasters and also, in their own language, the Spanish band La Polla Records, the German band Beck's Pistols and Polish band The Analogs. It also appears on the German punk band Die Toten Hosen's cover album Learning English Lesson 2 (2017), with Colin McFaull participating.
