= Fillmore! =

Television series

- Created by: Scott M. Gimple
- Written by: Eddie Guzelian; Scott M. Gimple; Matthew Negrete; Madellaine Paxson; Laura McCreary; Mark Myers; John Cervenka; Sean Whalen; Julie DuFine; Amanda Rudolph; Keith Blocker
- Directed by: Christian Roman
- Voices of: Orlando Brown; Tara Strong; Horatio Sanz; Lauren Tom; Danny Tamberelli; Kyle Sullivan; Wendie Malick; Jeff Probst
- Narrated by: Don LaFontaine
- Opening theme: "Fillmore! Theme" based on "Das Über Tuber, or, The Mystery of Mr. P." by Ookla the Mok
- Composers: Adam English; Rand Bellavia; Walter Murphy
- Country of origin: United States
- Original language: English
- No. of seasons: 2
- No. of episodes: 26

Production
- Executive producer: Scott M. Gimple
- Running time: 22 minutes
- Production company: Walt Disney Television Animation

Original release
- Network: ABC Kids
- Release: September 14, 2002 – November 15, 2003
- Network: Toon Disney
- Release: January 2 – January 30, 2004

Fillmore! is an American animated television series created by Scott M. Gimple for ABC and, later, Toon Disney. It originally ran for two seasons from 2002 to 2004. A homage to popular police dramas of the 1970s, Fillmore! is centered on reformed juvenile delinquent Cornelius Fillmore and his new partner, Ingrid Third, members of the Safety Patrol at X Middle School.

It was the last series produced by Walt Disney Television Animation for ABC, before producing shows exclusively with Disney Channel and its sister channels. It maintains a dedicated fanbase and is considered a cult hit. Reruns later aired on Disney Channel, Toon Disney, and Disney XD.

== Premise ==
Seventh grader Cornelius Fillmore (voiced by Orlando Brown), a juvenile delinquent with a record, was caught raiding the school's new chalk shipment. He was "arrested" and given a choice by the safety patrol officer who caught him: either help him solve another case or spend the rest of middle school in detention. Fillmore decided to help out and he eventually decided to join up with the safety patrol.

The show is based around him and his partner Ingrid Third (voiced by Tara Strong) at X Middle School, which is located in the suburbs of Minneapolis and Saint Paul in Minnesota. The show's format parodies that of hard-boiled police dramas. X's safety patrol is much more actively involved in student behavior than a typical school's safety patrol, and officers often seem to spend more time patrolling than normally attending class, although they can be seen attending at times.

As part of the Safety Patrol at X Middle School, Fillmore and Ingrid solve crimes and mysteries. The series usually presents kid-friendly versions of common crimes, such as stolen scooters, smuggling tartar sauce, holding illegal frog races, and counterfeiting collector cards.

== Characters ==
Every character is named after a street in San Francisco, California.

=== Main ===
- Cornelius C. Fillmore (voiced by Orlando Brown) is a seventh grader at X Middle School and the main protagonist of the series. He is a member of the Safety Patrol. Fillmore was previously a juvenile delinquent until Wayne Liggit recruited him into the Safety Patrol as an alternate to spending the rest of middle school in detention. Fillmore is known for going above and beyond the standards of other Safety Patrol officers. He almost never loses a target even if it means destroying school property.
- Ingrid Third (voiced by Tara Strong) is Fillmore's goth best friend and partner on the X Middle School Safety Patrol. Before her arrival at X Middle School, Ingrid was a delinquent and was sent to a reform school in Nepal for an incident involving a stinkbomb and a piñata. Ingrid partners with Fillmore after he helped her clear her name.
- Horatio Vallejo (voiced by Horatio Sanz) is the junior commissioner of the Safety Patrol and Fillmore's immediate superior. Vallejo is often put at odds against Fillmore, such as when he is forced to take Fillmore off a case even though he does not want to, or Fillmore is close to solving it. He also often rebukes Fillmore for his reckless destruction of school property.
- Karen Tehama (voiced by Lauren Tom) is the crime scene investigator on the Safety Patrol who has a keen interest in forensics and can usually be counted on to know the word on the street.
- Joseph Anza (voiced by Danny Tamberelli) is the partner of Karen Tehama, known for his bodyguarding training and like Tehama, tends to know the word on the street.
- Danny O'Farrell (voiced by Kyle Sullivan) is the crime scene photographer for the Safety Patrol, though it is often joked that he should not be qualified to be a Safety Patroller by Vallejo. He has a tendency to get on other people's nerves and has some deep thoughts, overreacting, and weird ideas.
- Dawn S. Folsom (voiced by Wendie Malick) is the principal of X Middle School. Though she acts like a mayor in crime shows, Folsom often threatens to turn the Safety Patrol office into something else if they are unable to solve the case. However, she does much for her students and staff, sometimes anonymously.
- Vice Principal Raycliff (voiced by Jeff Probst) is the school's vice principal and Folsom's right-hand man. Though he acts like a secretary or as a vice mayor in crime shows, he never really says much, but can be counted on to gush out school facts, figures and catchy metaphors at the drop of a hat.

=== Recurring ===
- Mr. Collingwood (voiced by Kyle Gass) is a teacher at X Middle School.
- Augie Sansome (voiced by Frankie Muniz in "Test of the Tested", Kiel Holmes in "This Savior, a Snitch"): In the former episode, he was suspected by Fillmore and Ingrid of stealing the answer sheets to the S.A.T.T.Y. 9 test, but what he really stole turned out to be packets of tartar sauce. In the latter episode, he becomes a witness to a set up on Filmore and testifies at a student council meeting to clear Fillmore's name.
- Mrs. Cornwall (voiced by Holland Taylor) is an algebra teacher at X Middle School and a student in 1956. She strongly believes in the school's honor code.
- Librarian Lendrum (voiced by Brian George) is X Middle School's librarian.
- Cheri Shotwell (voiced by Debi Derryberry) is the lively, bubbly, blonde-haired cheerleader who also serves as a reporter or interviewer. She also frequently hosts parties and sleepovers.
- Philsky (voiced by Michael Welch) is the school's reporter, who usually co-anchors with Cheri.
- Vern Natoma (voiced by Marcus Toji): Editor-in-chief of the school's newspaper.
- Professor Third (voiced by Anthony Head): College professor and the father of Ingrid and Ariella.
- Jamie Townsend (voiced by Chris Marquette) is a smart student who wears glasses.
- Proper Kid (voiced by Shaun Fleming) is a blonde-haired boy who is a member of the Paddle Boat Club and dresses as a sea captain. He is so called due to his always pointing out what is fit.
- Lab Coat Kid #1 (voiced by Chris Marquette): As his title suggests, he is one of the kids who wear lab coats and often involved in the lab or science class.
- Wade (voiced by Michael Welch) is another blonde X Middle School reporter.
- Wayne Ligget (voiced by Lukas Behnken) was Fillmore's original Safety Patrol partner before he eventually moved away and was replaced by Ingrid when she came to X. Wayne and Fillmore reunite in the episode "South of Friendship, North of Honor", where Fillmore helps Wayne take down the school's distorted patrol sheriff and Wayne is subsequently named as his school's new safety patrol sheriff.
- Frankie Polk (voiced by Lukas Behnken) is a blonde-haired boy who has an affinity for sketching and painting. He is president of the Art Club.
- Sarah Beel (voiced by Mae Whitman) is one of several students at X Middle School who either bear malice to the school mascot, Lobstee the Lobster, or to anything else associated with lobstering.

== Production ==
The theme song for the show was written and performed by filk band Ookla the Mok. The instrumental is taken from the intro to the band's 1998 song "Das Über Tüber, or the Mystery of Mr. P.".

The announcer of the series was voice actor Don LaFontaine, best known for his catchphrase "In a world..."

== Episodes ==
=== Series overview ===
Season	Episodes	Originally aired	
Season	Episodes	First aired	Last aired
1	13	September 14, 2002	May 17, 2003
2	13	September 20, 2003	January 30, 2004

=== Season 1 (2002–2003) ===
No. overall	No. in season	Title	Directed by	Written by	Original release date	Prod. code
1	1	"To Mar a Stall"	Christian Roman	Eddie Guzelian	September 14, 2002	1C23-003
X Middle School's bathroom renovation project teeters on the brink of disaster as the new tagger "STAINLESS" strikes at will. Out of leads, Fillmore and Ingrid turn to Randall "the Vandal" Julian, another tagger called "FLAVA SAVA", currently in solitary detention. His help puts them back on the trail, but Randall escapes, forcing Fillmore and Ingrid to catch both "STAINLESS" and "FLAVA SAVA" before they strike again. Guest starring Mae Whitman, Kurtwood Smith, and Josh Peck Randall Julian is a parody of Dr. Hannibal Lecter from The Silence of the Lambs, which the episode shares many similarities with. Parodied crimes: vandalism/serial killing
2	2	"Test of the Tested"	Christian Roman	Scott M. Gimple	September 21, 2002	1C23-002
The student body is in an uproar when the controversial S.A.T.T.Y. 9 tests are stolen by an assailant dressed as X's beloved mascot, Lobstee the Lobster. The suspected thieves are a student who panicked during the test or Enid Quintara, the outspoken anti-S.A.T.T.Y 9 activist. Fillmore and Ingrid are under pressure – they have only 48 hours to find the tests or Principal Folsom will have the entire school retake the tests. Guest starring Kyle Gass and Frankie Muniz Parodied crimes: theft
3	3	"A Wurm in Our Midst"	Christian Roman	Scott M. Gimple	September 28, 2002	1C23-006
The Library's books have disappeared, and Tony Clementina, X Middle School's local heavy, is all too eager to take credit for it. Meanwhile, an empty bottle rocket made from a can of Carbee Cola leads Ingrid back to the biggest custard spill in X Middle School history, an incident that disturbingly points to Fillmore from back during his days as a delinquent. Guest starring Frankie Muniz Parodied crimes: theft, frameup, counterfeiting, extortion
4	4	"Cry, The Beloved Mascot"	Christian Roman	Matthew Negrete	October 5, 2002	1C23-005
Someone has stolen X Middle School's beloved mascot Lobstee the Lobster. Time is running out for both Lobstee and the Bocce Team, and the key to finding him before time runs out might be X's resident psychic, Alistair Greystone. It is up to Alistair and the Safety Patrol find Lobstee before it is too late. Guest starring Holly Robinson Peete and Gary Dourdan Parodied crimes: attempted assassination of a political leader and kidnapping, as well as the use of psychics in law enforcement.
5	5	"Red Robins Don't Fly"	Christian Roman	Madellaine Paxson	October 12, 2002	1C23-007
During an undercover sting operation, boxes of band candy were accidentally discovered in the lake. The candy is traced back to the Red Robins – seemingly a school club in the same manner as Girl Scouts who make record sales of their award-winning taffy. In reality, the Robins strong arm their competition (stealing candy and cookie dough, cheating in selling taffy, messing up signs of competitors), and the Safety Patrol have been trying to catch them in the act for a long time. Ingrid goes undercover as a Red Robin, but she fits the role all too well and becomes the prime contender for becoming the leader of the Robins when Malika, the current leader, graduates. Fillmore discovers that Malika used to be Vallejo's partner who also infiltrated the Robins, but was seduced and overcome by darker purposes. Ingrid must locate the secret Vault of stolen goods and shut down the Robins for good, or turn to darker purposes as Malika did. Guest starring Mae Whitman Parodied crimes: The Mafia and the dangers of undercover operations.
6	6	"Next Stop, Armageddon"	Christian Roman	Laura McCreary & Mark Myers	November 2, 2002	1C23-008
After accidentally destroying Folsom's birthday party, Fillmore and Ingrid are asked to do convention duty, but the train convention experiences sabotage, leaving the entire convention to be ruined. Fillmore and Ingrid first suspect the RC Car Club to be behind it, but Oscar, the best model railroad engineer at X, seems to be coping extremely well to the tragedy. He is suspected of being the saboteur. Parodied crimes: sabotage
7	7	"Nappers Never Sleep"	Christian Roman	Scott M. Gimple	November 9, 2002	1C23-001
Duappy, a virtual pet, has been stolen, and it is up to Fillmore and Ingrid to find X's pride and joy before a reporter comes to X to do a story on Duappy and before Duappy dies. They soon discover that Duappy may have been stolen not to harm, but to help. Guest starring Caroline Rhea, Steven Weber, and Mary Hart Parodied crimes: kidnapping
8	8	"Ingrid Third, Public Enemy #1"	Christian Roman	Scott M. Gimple	November 16, 2002	1C23-004
Fillmore's partner moves away to Tennessee, and he is partnered up with Brad Parnassus, the smartest kid at X Middle School. Rebellious and super-smart new student Ingrid Third does not take her introduction to X student body well at all, and a giant stink bomb explodes in the hallways. The case turns out not to be as simple as it originally seemed. Note: The episode is largely told in flashback and thus mostly takes place before the series' start. Guest starring John Rhys-Davies Parodied crimes: Detonating an explosive device in a public area, chemical terrorism, and frameup
9	9	"A Cold Day at X"	Christian Roman	Eddie Guzelian	November 23, 2002	1C23-009
Mrs. Cornwall's Pre-Algebra final exam looks like it is going to be a tough one, but four of her students have decided to take more extreme measures beyond studying. Fillmore sleeps over in the school to safeguard the exam, but an unexpected blizzard and officer Third's head cold leaves him standing alone to face a desperate gang of determined exam thieves. Guest starring Holland Taylor Parodied crimes: burglary and taking of hostages, along with Die Hard's "lone cop vs. gang of villains" plot
10	10	"Masterstroke of Malevolence"	Christian Roman	Madellaine Paxson	February 15, 2003	1C23-014
Mrs. Lawson's field trip to the Modern Contemporary Natural History, Art, Science and Miniature Museum takes a horrifying turn as someone draws a mustache on the priceless painting "The Lobster Man at Port". Fillmore, Ingrid, and O'Farrell work to find the culprit and save the painting, but the time is running out and everyone is a suspect. Guest starring Mae Whitman, Richard Riehle, Kristin Chenoweth, and Steven Weber Parodied crimes: vandalism and substance abuse
11	11	"Two Wheels, Full Throttle, No Breaks"	Christian Roman	Laura McCreary & Mark Myers	February 22, 2003	1C23-013
Scooter thefts are up, and the Safety Patrol faces a challenge from student activist Derek Minna, who establishes B.A.G.A.S.T. (Boys And Girls Against Scooter Theft), a scooter and rollerblade equipped task force that he intends to ultimately replace the safety patrol. Fillmore and Ingrid trace the thefts to the Metal Shop and infiltrate the gang. They discover the mysterious "Stingray", and who has plans for the stolen scooters. Parodied crimes: motor vehicle theft, with many of the scenes of the episode parodying the film Gone in 60 Seconds, Guardian Angels, criminal enterprises
12	12	"Of Slain Kings on Checkered Fields"	Christian Roman	Eddie Guzelian	May 10, 2003	1C23-021
X Middle School's best hope to break a losing streak in the chess tournament is Checkmatey, a flamboyant rapper who is X's finest chess player, but somebody is out to get him. The suspects are Tyson Pelarez, leader of the Society of the Preservation of Ethics in Chess, or Nelson Kelloch, Checkmatey's biggest rival. Fillmore and Ingrid are on the case – but the clock is ticking down to the championship match and Checkmatey is nowhere to be found. Guest starring Daveigh Chase Parodied crimes: attempted murder, kidnapping, gambling, and drinking
13	13	"A Forgotten Yesterday"	Christian Roman	Eddie Guzelian	May 17, 2003	1C23-015
The heat is on from Student Council Representative Peabody to find a stolen case of computer disks holding information on term papers off the street, but the perps always seem one step ahead of the Safety Patrol. After a botched raid and the sabotage of his bike, Fillmore turns to Sonny Lombard, his old partner from his bad-boy days. They track the disks back to Rudy Teravall, the Kingpin of Home Economics, Fillmore learns where the disks are, but just as Fillmore and Ingrid get ready to move in on Rudy's gang, Peabody gets tipped off about bootleg hall passes in Fillmore's desk. Fillmore gets suspended from the force – and has to prove that he has not gone bad again. Meanwhile Sonny appears to have a mysterious agenda. Guest starring Marcus T. Paulk and Kathy Kinney Parodied crimes: theft and burglary

=== Season 2 (2003–2004) ===
No. overall	No. in season	Title	Directed by	Written by	Original release date	Prod. code
14	1	"The Currency of Doubt"	Christian Roman	Madellaine Paxson	September 20, 2003	1C23-019
Tina and Toby are the stars of the school at both dancing and smoit-collecting. Smoits are tokens found on dairy bars and packets of chips used to buy basically anything a kid could want once enough of them are saved up. The smoit stash goes missing, and Fillmore and Ingrid go undercover in X's steamy underground casino scene. They discover Toby's gambling debts, and he becomes the prime suspect, which destroys his dance partnership with Tina, but the case is not as simple as it appears. Meanwhile, Fillmore is having a little too much trouble obsessing over his damaged sash (that is, until it dissolves in a vat of chili). Guest starring Jason Fuchs Parodied crimes: theft and illegal gambling
15	2	"The Shreds Fell like Snowflakes"	Christian Roman	Matthew Negrete	September 27, 2003	1C23-025
Vallejo's nearing his second term test for Junior Commissioner, and in the meantime, a crime crops up involving 'The Shredder'- an anonymous criminal who shreds people's pet projects. The catch is that not a single one of the victims saw the Shredder's face. This seems like a job for Vallejo's old profiler partner, Frank Bishop, who was driven from the Safety Patrol in disgrace (due to a threatened lawsuit against the school by parents whose son was caught doing a game scam by being stopped by Frank with gazpacho, which the boy was allergic to). He deduces that the Shredder is hitting students from the Drama Club in alphabetical order – and his own sister, Francine, is next on the list, but these shredding incidents are not all they appear to be. Guest starring Mae Whitman and Kyle Gass Parodied crimes: police brutality, serial killing, and conspiracy
16	3	"Foes Don't Forgive"	Christian Roman	Matthew Negrete	October 4, 2003	1C23-022
Reformed thug Linus Santiago impresses the crowd at the X Middle School Talent Show with his magic act, but his disappearing trick with Dewey Hubble's robotic dog Barcode goes horribly wrong – it will not reappear. Santiago refuses to tell the Safety Patrol how he did the trick due to the Magician's Code, but by doing so, he makes himself the prime suspect. Dewey is anxious to get it back as it is a stepping stone to getting a real dog; when Barcode's collar is found in the lake, all hope could be lost – for both Dewey and Santiago. Parodied crimes: kidnapping
17	4	"South of Friendship, North of Honor"	Christian Roman	Madellaine Paxson	October 11, 2003	1C23-023
Spring Break has arrived, so Fillmore is taking the time to visit his former partner, Wayne Liggett. In Wayne's new school, something about the Safety Patrol stinks – so much that Wayne's partner Emily had to quit. The prize pralines of the school have been stolen, and the prime suspect is Patrol Sheriff Thrift – who just so happens to be the son of their principal. Guest starring Thomas Dekker and R. Lee Ermey Parodied crimes: police corruption
18	5	"Immune to All but Justice"	Christian Roman	Eddie Guzelian	October 18, 2003	1C23-024
X Middle School has become obsessed with Canada – and the ambassador's son is staying over, along with his assistant Penny Madrid, who happens to be an old partner in crime with Fillmore. Winston Kotter, the Canadian ambassador, turned Penny around just as the Safety Patrol turned Fillmore around – but Fillmore cannot help but suspect something is up, especially as a huge supply of counterfeit baseball cards appear. For Fillmore's dismay, Winston has full diplomatic immunity and plans to pin the crime on Penny. Without the power to officially apprehend him, Fillmore and the Safety Patrol do not know what to do. Guest starring Francesca Marie Smith Parodied crimes: counterfeiting and abuse of diplomatic immunity. The plot is inspired by Lethal Weapon 2
19	6	"The Nineteenth Hole is a Shallow Grave"	Christian Roman	Scott M. Gimple	November 1, 2003	1C23-016
Something is down at the X Middle School Open – professional golfers are failing at games, and foul play is suspected. Normally, Fillmore would be eager for an undercover job like this, but something in his past – something involving mini-golf – is making him hesitate. Guest starring Thomas Dekker Parodied crimes: bribery, intimidation, match fixing, and point shaving
20	7	"Links in a Chain of Honor"	Christian Roman	John Cervenka & Sean Whalen	November 8, 2003	1C23-026
Rookie Officer Peter Chestnut is the latest of four brothers to join the Safety Patrol. He has a lot to live up to – his older brother Robert was a highly decorated Safety Patroller and is now the Student Council President. When a shipment of stolen X Middle School foam spirit lobster claws is tracked back to also-ran Oscar Mabini, it looks like Peter has closed his first case, but all is not what it seems, and family honor has everything to do with it. Parodied crimes: theft and bribery
21	8	"The Unseen Reflection"	Christian Roman	Madellaine Paxson	November 15, 2003	1C23-027
Vampirita, a series of novels about an astronaut vampire, has attracted a huge following at X – and none more so that Torrey and Terri. The next installment of the series will be released in a fortnight, and until then, fans can audition to star in the next book. Terri and Torrey start to build projects to win the auditions, but every time one is finished, it gets sabotaged. Naturally, the main suspects are two members of a rival novel's fanclub – TQ, a mysterious and riddle-talking guy with an affinity for multicultural cuisine, and Trace, a girl who never seems to be happy with the color of her hair, but evidence points to neither. It must be determined who could have enough knowledge about the projects to find the perfect way to sabotage them. Guest starring Olivia Hack, Tanya Roberts, and Steven Weber Parodied crimes: sabotage, religious bigotry (between rival fanclubs)
22	9	"Codename: Electric Haircut"	Christian Roman	Matthew Negrete	January 2, 2004	1C23-017
Fillmore and Ingrid have to investigate the mysterious vanishing of a student named Alexis, only to find that all records of her have vanished from the school, and she has even been taken out of pictures. At the same time someone is working on a computer virus called Electric Haircut which could cause some major reputation damage to the popular students. Meanwhile, Vallejo deals with his hot cocoa intake, a spoof of police officers' caffeine addiction. Guest starring Hayden Panettiere, Raven-Symoné, Vincent Pastore, and Michael Welch Parodied crimes: missing persons and computer viruses (parody of The Net)
23	10	"Play On, Maestro, Play On"	Christian Roman	Laura McCreary & Mark Myers	January 9, 2004	1C23-029
The Ultrabox, the hottest new game system on the market, makes its debut at X, and everyone wants one – including "The Maestro", a gaming mastermind who will stop at nothing to get it. Fillmore and Ingrid track him down, but the Ultrabox is stolen while he is in custody. It looks like a copycat is on the loose, but there is more to this case than meets the eye. Parodied crimes: theft, vandalism, and copycat crime
24	11	"A Dark Score Evened"	Christian Roman	Julie DuFine; Amanda Rudolph and Matthew Negrete	January 16, 2004	1C23-011
Four victims and four bullies: Rochelle and Bryan who physically bully Wilbur and Grover, and Fiona and Horace who verbally bully Becca and Stella. Someone can no longer stand people being made to feel helpless and scared and is targeting each victim's bully in turn. Despite not wanting to help bullies, Fillmore sets up a bodyguard system for some of the bullies and starts to work on who would want to have scared the bullies so much. The main suspects are obviously the four victims, but the victim of each bully has an alibi for when their tormentor was terrorized. Guest starring Noel Fisher, A. J. Trauth Parodied crimes: Vigilantism
25	12	"Field Trip of the Just"	Christian Roman	Keith Blocker and Matthew Negrete	January 23, 2004	1C23-010
Guildenstern, the Science Department's tarantula mascot, has been poisoned, and the prime suspect, Eric Orben, has escaped into the city. Fillmore is given authority to go out into town and catch Eric, but he has to contend with a relentless opponent from his bad-boy past and a case that is not as obvious as it seems. Guest starring Raven-Symoné, Ajay Naidu, and Steve Carell Parodied crimes: attempted murder and cover-up
26	13	"This Saviour, a Snitch"	Christian Roman	Christian Roman	January 30, 2004	1C23-030
Facing expulsion under Principal Folsom's new 'Three Strikes, You're Expelled' rule, Fillmore must protect the only person that can clear his name to a crime he has been framed for: the destruction of a giant Folsom statue made out of 12,000 pieces of macaroni. Parodied crimes: The controversial three-strikes law, Code of Silence, extortion, and frameup

== Broadcast ==
Fillmore! premiered on ABC's Saturday morning programming block, ABC Kids, on September 14, 2002. The show continued to air on the block through the next two seasons.

On September 2, 2003, reruns began airing on Toon Disney, and the final five episodes aired on the channel in January 2004. It also aired on Disney XD until August 2009. It was briefly shown again on April 19, 2018.

== Home media release ==
While the series has never been released on VHS or DVD, all 26 episodes are available (for digital download) dubbed in German from iTunes Germany and Amazon Germany. It also appears on Google Play but is currently unavailable to buy. Fillmore! was released on streaming via Disney+ in the United Kingdom and the Republic of Ireland on July 27, 2022. It is also advertised on Apple TV.
