= Two Monkeys =

Studio album by Cock Sparrer
- Released: 1997
- Genre: Punk rock
- Label: Bitzcore

Cock Sparrer chronology
Guilty as Charged (1994)	Two Monkeys (1997)	Here We Stand (2007)

Two Monkeys is an album by the punk rock band Cock Sparrer, released in 1997. It was initially released in Germany.

== Critical reception ==
Professional ratings
Review scores
Source	Rating
AllMusic	3/5 stars

AllMusic wrote: "Pick up the original as a collector's item, but save your ears for the 2009 Captain Oi! reissue, which remixes the original master tapes and reveals the album for the all-round masterpiece it ought to have been." The Sunderland Echo called the songs "anthemic street punk in classic Sparrer style."

== Track listing ==
1. "A.U."
2. "Before the Flame Die"
3. "Tart"
4. "Lies?"
5. "East End Girl"
6. "Anthem"
7. "Time to Be Me"
8. "I Live in Marbella"
9. "Bats Out"
10. "Battersea Bardot"
11. "I Feel a Death Coming On"
12. "Back Home"
13. "Goodbye"
