= As Cruel as School Children =

Studio album by Gym Class Heroes
- Released: July 25, 2006
- Genres: Alternative rock; alternative hip hop; rap rock
- Length: 49:19
- Labels: Decaydance, Fueled by Ramen
- Producers: S*A*M and Sluggo; Patrick Stump (co.); Doug White

Gym Class Heroes chronology
The Papercut Chronicles (2005)	As Cruel as School Children (2006)	The Quilt (2008)

Singles from As Cruel as School Children
- 1. "The Queen and I" Released: August 28, 2006; 2. "New Friend Request" Released: October 28, 2006; 3. "Cupid's Chokehold" Released: November 7, 2006; 4. "Shoot Down the Stars" Released: May 11, 2007; 5. "Clothes Off!!" Released: July 27, 2007

As Cruel as School Children is the third studio album by American rap rock band Gym Class Heroes, released by Decaydance/Fueled by Ramen on July 25, 2006. It was co-produced by Fall Out Boy's Patrick Stump.

The album was the band's breakthrough into mainstream success, spawning the hits "Cupid's Chokehold" and "Clothes Off!!." The album received generally favorable reviews and has since been certified gold by the RIAA.

== Background ==
As Cruel as School Children followed Gym Class Heroes' 2005 album The Papercut Chronicles. In a 2021 interview with HotNewHipHop, lead vocalist Travie McCoy explained, "We had signed to Fueled By Ramen and we got upstreamed to Atlantic Records so we had a bigger budget. The goal for me with that record was to show how much the 80s had an effect on me musically." He wanted the album to reflect the influence of 1980s music on him and the diverse musical background of the four band members.

The album also revisited "Cupid's Chokehold," originally released on The Papercut Chronicles, after the song began gaining radio airplay in the Midwest.

Discussing the album's title with The Charlotte Observer in 2006, McCoy said it refers to adolescent experiences: "A lot of defining moments that build or break your character happen then. The title ('As Cruel as School Children') is a metaphor. Every day, you have to deal with milk-money bullies—whether you're in school or not."

== Music and lyrics ==
As Cruel as School Children shows a significant departure from the style of their previous work, such as the use of a drum machine, acoustic guitar, synthesizers, and the band dabbling in many genres such as electronica, funk and soul. There are also references to contemporary phenomena such as MySpace and text messaging, partying, and relationships.

The song "Clothes Off!" features Fall Out Boy vocalist Patrick Stump, who also co-produced the album. The hook is from Jermaine Stewart's 1986 song "We Don't Have to Take Our Clothes Off." "Biters Block" features Speech of Arrested Development, and "7 Weeks" describes life as a touring band with William Beckett of The Academy Is.... The chorus for "Cupid's Chokehold" comes from the single "Breakfast in America" by Supertramp and is sung by Stump.

== Release and reception ==
Professional ratings
Review scores
Source	Rating
AbsolutePunk	79%
AllMusic	3.5/5 stars
Alternative Press	(positive)
Drowned in Sound	6/10
Entertainment.ie	2.5/5 stars
God Is in the TV	3.5/5
RapReviews	6/10 stars
Spin	(favorable)

As Cruel as School Children was released by Decaydance/Fueled by Ramen on July 25, 2006, and distributed by Atlantic Records. The album debuted at No. 93 on the US Billboard 200 chart, becoming the group's first album to reach the chart, and it peaked No. 35. On August 9, 2007, the album was certified gold by the Recording Industry Association of America (RIAA) for sales of over 500,000 copies in the United States.

The album received generally positive reviews. Billboard described the album as a "tongue-in-cheek soundtrack for the new generation from a group that fuses rap with rock and R&B."

Glenn Gamboa of Newsday wrote "Imagine OutKast as a live band or The Roots steeped in indie rock and you get close to the Gym Class Heroes sound. … With the right help, Gym Class Heroes could flip hip-hop the way De La Soul did with '3 Feet High and Rising.'"

Clayton J. Hein of the Times Record News called As Cruel as School Children "one of a few surprising albums of the 2006 summer," adding it's "a perfect mixture for the frat/sorority house or a high school that's growing up too soon."

Jon Caramanica of Spin magazine noted that the band had "finally untangled the emo-rap paradigm, understanding that it's the target demographic first, then the method, not vice versa. Travis McCoy is an intuitive, if not inventive, MC, and the band knows all the nuances of post-frat rock."

In a less enthusiastic review, Victoria Durham of Drowned in Sound stated that the band needed to "get rid of the filler" in order to be more successful. Though, she also noted the group's potential, referring to their creative rhyming as what could set them up to be "the OutKast of the rock world."

== Track listing ==
=== Standard Edition ===
All songs written by Gym Class Heroes, Sam Hollander and Dave Katz, except "Clothes Off", written by Gym Class Heroes, Sam Hollander, Dave Katz, Preston Glass and Narada Walden and "Cupid's Chokehold/Breakfast In America," written by Travis McCoy, Roger Hodgson and Rick Davies.

1. 1st Period: "The Queen and I" – 3:15
2. 2nd Period: "Shoot Down the Stars" – 3:38
3. 3rd Period: "New Friend Request" – 4:14
4. 4th Period: "Clothes Off!!" (featuring Patrick Stump) – 3:55
5. Lunch: "Sloppy Love Jingle, Pt. 1" – 1:52
6. 6th Period: "Viva la White Girl" – 3:53
7. 7th Period: "7 Weeks" (featuring William Beckett) – 3:51
8. 8th Period: "It's Ok, but Just This Once!" – 3:10
9. Study Hall: "Sloppy Love Jingle, Pt. 2" – 1:01
10. 10th Period: "Biters Block" – 3:48
11. Yearbook Club: "Boys in Bands" (interlude) – 0:59
12. 12th Period: "Scandalous Scholastics" – 4:17
13. 13th Period: "On My Own Time (Write On!)" – 4:42
14. Intramurals: "Cupid's Chokehold/Breakfast In America" (featuring Patrick Stump) – 3:58
15. Detention: "Sloppy Love Jingle, Pt. 3" – 2:15

=== Limited Edition Bonus Disc ===
1. "Clothes Off!!" (Stress remix) (featuring Ghostface Killah, Tyga and Patrick Stump) – 4:32
2. "Viva la White Girl" (remix) (featuring Lil Wayne) – 4:46
3. "The Machine and I" (featuring Keith Buckley) – 4:22
4. "New Friend Request" (SK1 Ferrer remix) (featuring Papoose) – 4:15

== Personnel ==
Gym Class Heroes

- Travis McCoy (Schleprok) – vocals
- Matt McGinley – drums
- Disashi Lumumba-Kasongo – guitar
- Eric Roberts – bass guitar

Additional musicians

- S*A*M – programming (1–13, 15)
- Sluggo – additional guitars (1–13, 15)
- Patrick Stump – additional instrumentation and programming (1–13, 15), additional vocals (4, 14)
- Lev aka The Ghost of Harlem – keyboards (1–13, 15)
- Bob McLynn (Suge White) – additional vocals (1), bartender vocals (5, 9, 15)
- William Beckett – featured vocals (7)
- Speech – additional vocals (10)
- Jake Cohen, Andrea Goetz, Brendon Katz, Carden Katz, Lauren Lachs, Noah Malale – kid vocals (10)
- The Kids of Crush High – featured vocals (12)
- Adam English – piano (14)
- Rand Bellavia – background vocals (14)

Technical personnel

- S*A*M – producer (1–15), engineer (14)
- Sluggo – producer (1–13, 15)
- Doug White – producer and engineer (14)
- Patrick Stump – co-producer (1–13, 15)
- Tim Latham – mixing (1–13, 15)
- Serban Ghenea – mixing (14)
- UE Nastasi – mastering (1–13, 15)
- Chris Athens – mastering (14)
- Joel Hamberger, Eric Ronick – engineers (1–13, 15)
- Matt Green – additional mixing engineer (14)

== Charts ==
=== Weekly charts ===
Chart (2007)	Peak position
Australian Albums (ARIA)	40
Dutch Albums (Album Top 100)	68
French Albums (SNEP)	191
Irish Albums (IRMA)	54
Scottish Albums (Official Charts)	36
UK Albums (Official Charts)	19
UK R&B Albums (Official Charts)	4
US Billboard 200	35
US Top Rap Albums (Billboard)	8

=== Year-end charts ===
Chart (2007)	Position
UK Albums (OCC)	198
US Billboard 200	139

== Certifications ==
Region	Certification	Certified units/sales
United Kingdom (BPI)	Gold	100,000^{^}
United States (RIAA)	Gold	500,000^{^}
^{^} Shipments figures based on certification alone.

== Release history ==
Region	Date
United States	July 25, 2006
United Kingdom	May 7, 2007

== In popular culture ==
A number of tracks have been used in other media. Track 3, "New Friend Request" and track 8, "It's OK, but Just this Once!" were used in the film Snakes On A Plane. Travis McCoy also guest stars on the films theme tune, "Bring It (Snakes on a Plane)", whilst the song "It's OK, But Just This Once" was briefly featured on HBO's hit series Entourage in episode 319 - "The Prince's Bride". The chorus of "Shoot Down The Stars" is briefly heard in Never Back Down.
