= Here We Stand (Cock Sparrer album) =

Studio album by Cock Sparrer
- Released: November 4, 2007
- Genre: Punk rock, Oi!
- Length: 45:30
- Label: Captain Oi!
- Producer: Cock Sparrer: Burgess, Smith, McFaull, Beaufoy, Bruce

Cock Sparrer chronology
Two Monkeys (1997)	Here We Stand (2007)

Professional ratings
Review scores
Source	Rating
Allmusic	4/5 stars

Here We Stand, released in November 2007, is the 6th studio album by English punk rock band Cock Sparrer. Recorded by former Vibrators bassist, Pat Collier, and mixed by Rancid's Lars Frederiksen and Michael Rosen, the album is the band's first new material for ten years. In addition to the 14-track CD version, the album was also released on vinyl as a picture disc. The tracks "Will You?" and "So Many Things" were omitted to improve the overall sound quality.

A 7-inch picture disc single, limited to 1000 copies, was released at the same time. It contained "Too Late" (the album's opening song), and a rerecorded version of "Because You're Young" exclusive to the picture disc single.

== CD track listing ==
All songs written by Cock Sparrer: Burgess, Smith, McFaull, Beaufoy, Bruce.

1. "Too Late" – 3:02
2. "Gotta Get Out" – 3:34
3. "Did You Have a Nice Life Without Me?" – 3:01
4. "True to Yourself" – 3:29
5. "Time to Make Your Move" – 2:38
6. "Will You?" – 3:31
7. "Better Than This" – 3:32
8. "Don't Stop" – 3:40
9. "Spirit of '76" – 3:55
10. "So Many Things" – 3:28
11. "Last Orders" – 2:28
12. "Despite All This" – 3:03
13. "Sussed" – 3:08
14. "Suicide Girls" – 3:03

== Vinyl track listing ==
=== Side one ===
1. Too Late
2. Gotta Get Out
3. Did You Have a Nice Life Without Me?
4. True to Yourself
5. Time to Make Your Move
6. Better Than This

=== Side two ===
1. Don't Stop
2. Spirit of '76
3. Last Orders
4. Despite All This
5. Sussed
6. Suicide Girls

== Personnel ==
- Colin McFaull – vocals
- Micky Beaufoy – lead guitar
- Daryl Smith – guitar, vocals
- Steve Burgess – bass guitar, vocals
- Steve Bruce – drums
- Additional vocals on "Suicide Girls": Daughters and Friends of Sparrer

=== Production ===
- Engineer: Pat Collier
- Recording Location: Perry Vale Studios, London
- Mixing: Lars Frederiksen and Michael Rosen
- Mixing Location: Biabella Studios, USA
- Producer: Cock Sparrer
- Mastering: Tim Turan at Turan Audio
- Photography: Sam Bruce

Personnel and production credits source: CD insert booklet
