= Shock Troops (album) =

Studio album by Cock Sparrer
- Released: 1983
- Genre: Punk rock
- Length: 37:32 (1993 CD reissue)
- Label: Razor
- Producer: Cock Sparrer

Cock Sparrer chronology
| Cock Sparrer (1978) | Shock Troops (1983) | Running Riot in '84 (1984) |

Professional ratings
Review scores
| Source | Rating |
|---|---|
| AllMusic | 3.5/5 stars |

Shock Troops is the second album, and the first widely distributed, by punk rock band Cock Sparrer. It was released in 1983 on Razor Records. The lineup on the photograph on the sleeve from left to right is Chris Skepis, Steve Bruce, Colin McFaull, Steve Burgess, and Shug O'Neill.

== Track listing ==
All titles written by Cock Sparrer

=== Original release ===
==== Side A ====
1. "Where Are They Now"
2. "Riot Squad"
3. "Working"
4. "Take 'em All"
5. "We're Coming Back"

==== Side B ====
1. "Watch Your Back"
2. "I Got Your Number"
3. "Secret Army"
4. "Droogs Don't Run"
5. "Out on an Island"

=== Subsequent releases ===
1. "Where Are They Now"
2. "Riot Squad"
3. "Working"
4. "Take 'em All"
5. "We're Coming Back"
6. "England Belongs to Me"
7. "Watch Your Back"
8. "I Got Your Number"
9. "Secret Army"
10. "Droogs Don't Run"
11. "Out on an Island"
12. "Argy Bargy"

==== 1993 bonus track ====
13. "Colonel Bogey"

==== 2001 bonus tracks ====
14. "I Need a Witness"
15. "Platinum Blonde"
16. "What's It Like to Be Old?"
17. "Teenage Heart"
18. "Run for Cover"

== Personnel ==
- Colin McFaull − vocals
- Steve Burgess − bass
- Steve Bruce − drums
- Micky Beaufoy − lead guitar
- Chris Skepis − rhythm guitar

== Release history ==
| Region | Date | Label | Format | Catalog | Notes |
|---|---|---|---|---|---|
| UK | 1983 | Razor Records | LP | RAZ 009 | 10-track |
| UK | 1991 | Link Records | LP | LINK LP 141 | 12-track |
| UK | 1993 | Captain Oi! Records | CD/LP | AHOY 004 | 13-track |
| UK | 1993 | Step-1 Music | CD | STEP CD 028 | 13-track + Running Riot in '84 |
| US | 2001 | Taang! Records | CD/LP | TAANG! 152 | Deluxe Edition, 18-track |
| UK | 2009 | Captain Oi Records | LP | AHOY PD4 | 13-track picture disc |

== In popular media ==
"England Belongs to Me" is the entrance song for UFC fighter Dan Hardy.

"I Got Your Number" plays during the jet engine stunt scene in the 2010 American film Jackass 3D.
