= Cookie Jar (Gym Class Heroes song) =

2008 single by Gym Class Heroes

Single by Gym Class Heroes featuring The-Dream

from the album The Quilt
- Released: July 8, 2008
- Length: 3:35
- Label: Decaydance, Fueled by Ramen
- Songwriters: Gym Class Heroes, The-Dream, T-Pain
- Producer: Christopher "Tricky" Stewart

Gym Class Heroes singles chronology
"Peace Sign/Index Down" (2008)	"Cookie Jar" (2008)	"Guilty as Charged" (2008)

The-Dream singles chronology
"Baby" (2008)	"Cookie Jar" (2008)	"Fall Back" (2008)

Music video
- "Cookie Jar" on YouTube

"Cookie Jar" is the second single from the Gym Class Heroes album, The Quilt. The song features The-Dream singing the chorus with Travis McCoy. It was released on July 8, 2008, on the Patches from the Quilt - EP. "Cookie Jar" peaked at number 59 on the US Billboard Hot 100 and charted within the top 10 of the UK Singles Chart.

== Premise ==
The song was written by lead singer Travis McCoy to describe the temptations a man in a relationship is offered, using the idea of various types of cookies in a reachable jar as an analogy. Guitarist Disashi Lumumba-Kasongo described the song as being "based on the kind of dilemma that many guys have, like, they find a girl and then they're like, 'Oh, but I can have this one; it would be so much better.' Then they go to the other girl and they're like, 'No… but I think this would be better.' The lyrics are based on the dilemma of trying to find the girl that makes you feel happy and having trouble with that."

== Chart performance ==
In the United States, "Cookie Jar" peaked at number 59 on the Billboard Hot 100. In the United Kingdom, "Cookie Jar" debuted at number 16 on the UK Singles Chart on September 7, 2008, solely on downloads. The song and went on to peak at number six on the chart on September 21, 2008, becoming Gym Class Hero's third top-10 song in Britain. In Australia, "Cookie Jar" debuted at number 50 on the ARIA Singles Chart on September 22, 2008, and remained there the next week. During its fourth week on the chart, it ascended to number 44, and in its fifth week, ascended to its peak position of number 41.

In the United Kingdom, "Cookie Jar" debuted at number 16 on the UK Singles Chart for the week ending date September 13, 2008 – solely on downloads. The song went on to peak at number six on the chart for the week ending date September 27, 2008. The single became Gym Class Hero's third top ten song in Britain following "Cupid's Chokehold" and "Clothes Off!!" in 2007.

In Australia, "Cookie Jar" debuted at number 50 on the ARIA Singles Chart on September 22, 2008, and remained there the next week. During its fourth week on the chart, it ascended to number 44, and in its fifth week, ascended to its peak position of number 41.

== Music video ==
Directed by Dale "Rage" Resteghini, the music video was filmed on June 23, 2008. In the video, Gym Class Heroes and the Dream trying to resist the temptations of women at the club. McCoy is shown telling a therapist why he can't keep his hands out of the cookie jar, and at the end of the video, he is restrained in a padded cell.

== Critical reception ==
Mal Siret wrote for The Times: "Cookie Jar, with its metaphorical message of an uncontrollable attraction to the opposite sex, epitomises the band’s playful fixation with fearless fun (think Will Smith in his heyday)."

Grant of BBC Radio 1's Chart Blog wrote: "The mix of Hip-Hop and rock that Gym Class Heroes produce always makes a nice sound, but I just can't get over the bizarre rap. The lyrics sound like something a group of 13 year old boys would make up at break, in between Food Technology and Biology."

== Charts ==
=== Weekly charts ===
Chart (2008)	Peak position
Australia (ARIA)	41
Canada Hot 100 (Billboard)	91
Czech Republic Airplay (ČNS IFPI)	34
Ireland (IRMA)	24
Netherlands (Dutch Top 40 Tipparade)	11
Netherlands (Single Top 100)	85
Scotland Singles (OCC)	16
Slovakia Airplay (ČNS IFPI)	65
UK Singles (OCC)	6
UK Hip Hop/R&B (OCC)	2
US Billboard Hot 100	59

=== Year-end charts ===
Chart (2008)	Position
UK Singles (OCC)	70

== Certifications ==
Region	Certification	Certified units/sales
United Kingdom (BPI)	Silver	200,000^{^}
^{^} Shipments figures based on certification alone.

== Release history ==
Release dates and formats for "Cookie Jar"
Region	Date	Format	Label(s)	Ref.
United States	July 8, 2008	Rhythmic airplay	Fueled By Ramen	
United States	July 29, 2008	Mainstream airplay	Fueled By Ramen	
