= Clothes Off!! =

2007 single by Gym Class Heroes

"Clothes Off!!!"

Single by Gym Class Heroes featuring Patrick Stump

from the album As Cruel as School Children
- Released: July 27, 2007
- Genre: Pop-rap
- Length: 3:55
- Label: Decaydance; Fueled by Ramen; Atlantic
- Songwriters: Travis McCoy; Sam Hollander; Dave Katz
- Producer: S*A*M and Sluggo

Gym Class Heroes singles chronology
"Shoot Down the Stars" (2007)	"Clothes Off!!!" (2007)	"Cookie Jar" (2008)

Gym Class Heroes UK singles chronology
"Cupid's Chokehold" (2007)	"Clothes Off!!" (2007)	"The Queen and I" (2007)

Patrick Stump singles chronology
"Cupid's Chokehold" (2007)	"Clothes Off!!" (2007)	"This City" (2011)

Music video
- "Clothes Off!!" on YouTube

"Clothes Off!!" is the fifth single from Gym Class Heroes' third album, As Cruel as School Children. It features vocalist Patrick Stump of Fall Out Boy. It was released in June 2007, and peaked at number 46 on the Billboard Hot 100. Outside of the United States, "Clothes Off" peaked within the top ten of the charts in Finland, Ireland, and the United Kingdom.

The hook for the song interpolates Jermaine Stewart's 1986 single "We Don't Have to Take Our Clothes Off".

A remix to the song was released in November 2008 featuring rappers Reef the Lost Cauze and Ghostface Killah of Wu-Tang Clan.

== Music video ==
The video starts with the band driving up to a casino with the song "Viva La White Girl" playing. After checking into their rooms, Travie McCoy makes his way down to the casino floor and runs into an Elvis impersonator, played by Pete Wentz, playing a slot machine. Travie engages in a game of strip poker with several girls, and seemingly wins, as he is the only one that remains dressed. It all turns into a party with Elvis performing on a stage. About halfway through the video, Travis encounters people dressed like animals in the hotel, presumably furries at a convention. A dance-off then takes place with the fursuiters, who are afterwards revealed to be the members of Panic! at the Disco (Ryan Ross as the orange lion, Brendon Urie as the black and white dog, Jon Walker as the bear, and Spencer Smith as the seal).

Other cameos include Patrick Stump as a crowd member, and entrepreneur Johnny Cupcakes. British rapper Dizzee Rascal is also visible with some women for a few short seconds.

== Track listings ==
UK CD 1

1. "Clothes Off!!" (explicit album version)
2. "Shoot Down the Stars" (recorded live at Fopp)

UK CD 2

1. "Clothes Off!!" (explicit album version)
2. "On My Own Time (Write On)" (recorded live at Fopp)
3. "Clothes Off!!" (video)
4. "The Queen and I" (video)

UK vinyl

1. "Clothes Off!!" (explicit album version)
2. "Etched B-Side"

AU CD

1. "Clothes Off!!" (radio version)
2. "The Queen and I" (live acoustic)
3. "Boomerang Theory"

== Charts ==
=== Weekly charts ===
Chart (2007)	Peak position
Australia (ARIA)	11
Australian Urban (ARIA)	4
Austria (Ö3 Austria Top 40)	58
Europe (Eurochart Hot 100)	17
Finland (Suomen virallinen lista)	4
Germany (GfK)	85
Ireland (IRMA)	7
Netherlands (Single Top 100)	75
New Zealand (Recorded Music NZ)	13
Scotland Singles (Official Charts)	12
Slovakia Airplay (ČNS IFPI)	87
UK Singles (Official Charts)	5
UK Hip Hop/R&B (Official Charts)	3
US Billboard Hot 100	46
US Pop Airplay (Billboard)	20

=== Year-end charts ===
Chart (2007)	Position
Australia (ARIA)	97
Australian Urban (ARIA)	24
UK Singles (OCC)	92

== Certifications ==
Region	Certification	Certified units/sales
United Kingdom (BPI)	Silver	200,000^{‡}
^{‡} Sales+streaming figures based on certification alone.

== See also ==
- Furry fandom
