= We Love You =

- Dutch picture sleeve

Single by the Rolling Stones
- A-side: "Dandelion" (US)
- B-side: "Dandelion" (UK)
- Released: 18 August 1967 (UK); 2 September 1967 (US)
- Recorded: 13, 21 June, 2 and 19 July 1967
- Studio: Olympic, London
- Genre: Psychedelic pop; hard rock
- Length: 4:38
- Label: Decca (UK); London (US)
- Songwriter: Jagger–Richards
- Producer: Andrew Loog Oldham

The Rolling Stones UK singles chronology
"Let's Spend the Night Together" / "Ruby Tuesday" (1967)	"We Love You" (1967)	"Jumpin' Jack Flash" (1968)

The Rolling Stones US singles chronology
"Let's Spend the Night Together" / "Ruby Tuesday" (1967)	"Dandelion" / "We Love You" (1967)	"She's a Rainbow" (1967)

Promotional film
- "We Love You" on YouTube

"We Love You" is a song by the English rock band the Rolling Stones that was written by Mick Jagger and Keith Richards. Their first new release of the summer of 1967, it was first released as a single on 18 August in the United Kingdom, with "Dandelion" as the B-side. The song peaked at number eight in Britain and number 50 in the United States, where "Dandelion" was promoted as the A-side and peaked at number 14.

Written as a message of gratitude to their fans for the public support towards them during the drug arrests of Jagger and Richards, the recording features guest backing vocals by John Lennon and Paul McCartney of the Beatles. It is considered one of the Rolling Stones' most experimental songs, featuring sound effects, layers of vocal overdubs, and a prominent Mellotron part played by Brian Jones. The single's two tracks were the final new Stones recordings for which a production credit was given for band manager Andrew Loog Oldham. The recording sessions that produced "We Love You" and "Dandelion" represented Oldham's last work with the band before resigning as their producer over personal and professional conflicts with them.

Critics at the time of its release praised the song for its production and vocal and instrumental performances, while also noting its significance to the band's current status. However, some at the time viewed the song as somewhat overproduced. Retrospective reviews have been positive, with some describing its sound as too similar to the Beatles, and emblematic of the band losing its identity over the Summer of Love in favor of following trends. However, others praise the song as a unique offering to the genre of psychedelic music, and for its diverse range of musical influences.

== Background ==
By the late 1960s, drugs were common in the British music industry, although this fact was not commonly known by much of the public. In 1966, the ITV documentary A Boy Called Donovan publicised Donovan's use of marijuana to the wider world, marking one of the first times a musician's drug use had become so publicly known. Donovan later described how "this was the first time a British television audience had caught a glimpse of the lifestyle of the beatniks and many were shocked". In early 1967, Jagger, Richards and Jones began to be hounded by authorities over their recreational drug use, after the News of the World ran a three-part feature entitled "Pop Stars and Drugs: Facts That Will Shock You". The series described alleged LSD parties hosted by the Moody Blues attended by top stars including the Who's Pete Townshend and Cream's Ginger Baker, and alleged admissions of drug use by leading pop musicians. The first article targeted Donovan, who as a result was raided soon after, the second article (published on 5 February) targeted the Rolling Stones.

In February 1967, two members of the Rolling Stones – lead singer Mick Jagger and guitarist Keith Richards – were arrested at Richards' home, Redlands, West Wittering, Sussex for drug possession. At this point, Jagger had begun suing News of the World for libel over their article on the Rolling Stones' drug use. Although both Jagger and Richards were convicted following the raid, a publicity campaign by their colleagues in the music industry encouraged popular support and criticism of the decision to prosecute them. Most notably, the traditionally conservatively oriented newspaper The Times published an op-ed by William Rees-Mogg asking Who Breaks a Butterfly on a Wheel?, in which he criticised the prosecutions as unfounded and unnecessary. Additionally, the Who recorded cover versions of Stones songs "Under My Thumb" and "The Last Time" as a show of solidarity with the Stones throughout the trials.

== Composition ==
"We Love You" was written in the aftermath of the drug arrest and the public outrage that followed it, and has traditionally been interpreted as a message to fans of the group thanking them for their support through the controversy. Conversely, the song's lyrics have been described as "a spoof" of the Lennon–McCartney song "All You Need Is Love", which the Beatles performed on the Our World satellite broadcast on 25 June. However, the Rolling Stones began recording the song two weeks prior to the Our World broadcast. Alternatively, as Lennon insisted was the case, in his 1970 Rolling Stone interview, the lyrics can be seen as echoing the message of the Beatles song, on which Jagger and Richards were among the many chorus singers. Rolling Stones bassist Bill Wyman later said that Jagger and Richards had been working on the song "for some time".

== Recording ==
The Stones recorded "We Love You" during the sessions for Their Satanic Majesties Request at Olympic Studios during June and July 1967. In contrast to the single's flip side "Dandelion", which largely features baroque instrumentation and influences, "We Love You" is largely inspired by the burgeoning psychedelic genre, and by music of the Arab world. According to bassist Bill Wyman, the final arrangement was created in the studio. The opening piano riff was played by session musician Nicky Hopkins, who had been workshopping it prior to using it on the song.

In the first session, on 13 June 1967, all members but Charlie Watts attended. This session was primarily devoted to fleshing out the arrangement for the song. The Stones also worked further on "Dandelion", at this session, which had begun recording the previous day. Later that week, Brian Jones departed to Monterey, California to attend the city's International Pop Festival. Following his return, Jones suffered a nervous breakdown, and was hospitalized, missing further sessions for the song on 21 June and 2 July. However, the other band members, including now Watts, attended these sessions, and continued work on the song.

At the final session, Brian Jones returned after being discharged from hospital. Notable in the final mix of the song is Jones' performance on Mellotron, which has been acclaimed for its complexity and Jones' proficiency with the instrument. Studio engineer George Chkiantz said that even though there was a delay between hitting the note and the sound coming out of the Mellotron, Jones managed to overcome this challenge and get "a tight rhythmic punch" out of the instrument for the track.

For the final session, held on 19 July 1967, John Lennon, Paul McCartney and the poet Allen Ginsberg were invited to visit, following a meeting at McCartney's house a few days earlier. Lennon and McCartney ended up overdubbing backing vocals on the song. It has been suggested that the pair also contributed vocals to "Dandelion" at this session, as it was confirmed by Keith Richards in October 2023. It has been suggested that Lennon and McCartney had not been credited as to avoid any contractual issues with EMI (their record label).

== Release history ==
While it was recorded during the sessions for Their Satanic Majesties Request, "We Love You" was released as a non-album A-side on 18 August 1967 in the United Kingdom, with "Dandelion" as the B-side. The song reached number 8 on the British single charts. Two weeks later this single was released the United States, but with "Dandelion" promoted as the A-side; "Dandelion" reached number 14 on the Billboard Hot 100, whereas "We Love You" only got as high as 50. "We Love You" also charted within the top 10 on singles charts in Germany, Austria, Sweden, and Norway.

Mick Jagger was quoted at the time as saying that "We Love You" was "just a bit of fun". The original single releases had a faded-in coda consisting of a short, distorted section of vocals from the B-side, "Dandelion". The same effect, fading in a portion of "We Love You", was used at the end of "Dandelion". Musicologist Walter Everett identifies this feature as a response to the Beatles' use of a fade-out/fade-in ending to close their February 1967 single "Strawberry Fields Forever". This coda has generally been absent from reissues of the song on compilation albums by the Stones such as Through the Past, Darkly (Big Hits Vol. 2) and GRRR!. Similarly, "Dandelion" has also been traditionally abridged in this way on compilations that feature it. However, the 1989 release Singles Collection: The London Years features unabridged versions of both songs.

The single was later included on the UK version of the Stones' 1969 compilation album Through the Past, Darkly (Big Hits Vol. 2), but was not on the US version (although the B-side "Dandelion" is present on both versions), and does not appear on the current CD version of that album. However, it was released on some subsequent compilations such as More Hot Rocks (Big Hits & Fazed Cookies) (1972), Rolled Gold: The Very Best of the Rolling Stones (1975), 30 Greatest Hits (1977), the Singles Collection: The London Years (1989), and GRRR! (50-track and 80-track editions) (2012).

Cover versions of the song were later recorded by The Jazz Butcher, Ryuichi Sakamoto, Gregorian, and Cock Sparrer.

== Promotional film ==
The promotional film for the single was directed by Peter Whitehead. As a commentary on the song's origin it included footage from recording sessions along with segments that re-enacted the 1895 trial of Oscar Wilde, with Jagger, Richards and Marianne Faithfull respectively portraying Wilde, the judge in the Wilde trial, and Lord Alfred Douglas. Footage also appears of Brian Jones, apparently high on drugs with his eyes drooping and unfocused.

The producer of Top of the Pops refused to show the film on that programme. A BBC spokesman said the producer did not think it was suitable for the type of audience who watched Top of the Pops. He went on to say there was not a ban on it by the BBC, it was simply this producer's decision.

In 2022, the promotional film for "We Love You" was remastered in 4k resolution and released online for the first time.

== Contemporary reception ==
Among contemporary reviews of the single, Chris Welch of Melody Maker described the song as "considerably too much", and said that "The Stones and their highly recognisable friends chant the message while what sounds like mellotron, piano, drums and cymbals move to a monstrous, majestic climax like a soul Ravel." In the NME, Keith Altham identified "Dandelion" as the more "immediate" of the two sides. He described "We Love You" as "a musical-mindjammer with everything going like the clappers ... to provide that special kind of ugly-excitement in sound which is the Rolling Stones speciality", and he concluded: "The basic idea of the song is as simple as 'All You Need Is Love' but the musical holocaust surrounding it is so cleverly produced you will be able to listen to it again and again and still find new ideas." Cash Box called it "a psychedelic offering with sound effects and a brilliant vocal-instrumental showing."

In 1970, in an interview with Jann Wenner of Rolling Stone magazine, John Lennon described "We Love You" as an example of a trend he perceived of the Rolling Stones copying the Beatles' style and recent songs with their material, in this case, being very similar to the sentiment the Beatles had espoused in "All You Need Is Love". He said "Every fuckin' thing we did, Mick does exactly the same – he imitates us. And I would like one of you fuckin' underground people to point it out, you know Satanic Majesties is Pepper, 'We Love You,' it's the most fuckin' bullshit, that's 'All You Need Is Love.'"

== Retrospective reception ==
In the June 1997 issue of Mojo magazine, Jon Savage included the song in his list "Psychedelia: The 100 Greatest Classics". He also wrote: "'We Love You' sounded fabulous on the radio in high summer of '67 with its monster piano riff and Mellotron arabesques hanging in the air. It was only later that you noticed the heavy walking of the prison warden at the song's start or the sarcastic hostility of the lyrics." Author Stephen Davis describes the track as "sensational" and cites Jones' "panoramic Mellotron fanfare" as arguably his "last great contribution" to the Rolling Stones. Writing for AllMusic, Bill Janovitz describes Brian Jones as a "prodigy" for his musical contributions to "We Love You", while also highlighting Bill Wyman's "funky R&B bass line" and Charlie Watts' Bo Diddley-influenced drum performance as other strong elements of the recording.

In the view of sociomusicologist Simon Frith, writing in 1981, the song was symptomatic of the band's disorientation in the year that "pop" transformed to "rock". He said that the Stones' elevation to "hippie heroes", due to the drug busts, had an adverse effect on their music, since: "for a moment, Jagger and Richards' detached, selfish rock'n'roll commitment was shaken – 'We Love You' and the Satanic Majesties LP were too-obvious attempts to follow the Beatles' psychedelic trip. It wasn't until 1968, when youth politics got rougher, that the Stones made 'Jumping Jack Flash' and became a rock group, translating drug culture back into rock'n'roll terms."

Author and critic Philip Norman diagnosed "We Love You" as the band's "artistic nadir" brought on by Jagger's obsession with copying the Beatles' flower power. Writing for Mojo in 2002, music critic John Harris said in response to Norman's comments on the song: "Fortunately, nothing could be further from the facts. Its charms are legion: Nicky Hopkins' beautifully mesmeric piano, its opening chorus of sarcastic falsetto voices, mellotron passages … whose eeriness cannot help but evoke the idea of a conspiracy."

Many publications have listed "We Love You" as one of the Stones' best songs. The German edition of Rolling Stone magazine ranked it the band's 25th best song, while the Spanish edition of the magazine ranked it 32nd. Uncut magazine listed it as among the 50 essential songs from the Summer of Love, and in another article ranked as the band's 10th best song. In the magazine's entry on the song, music journalist Nick Hasted commented on the song's defiant origins.

Recorded the month after The Beatles’ “All You Need is Love”, this more urgently paced, and obviously cynical, combative contribution to Britain’s Summer Of Love is an us-and-them taunt from a band on the run, a defiant, two-fingered retaliation to concerted establishment attempts to jail Jagger, Richards and Jones for drug use and general bad manners. The hunted footsteps and slamming jail doors punctuating the record, and the Jagger-as-Wilde promo reel that completes it, shows the distorted scale of the year’s persecution which, for all the song’s sly bravado, helped kill Jones, and cripple the Stones.

== Personnel ==
According to authors Philippe Margotin and Jean-Michel Guesdon:

The Rolling Stones

- Mick Jagger – vocals
- Keith Richards – backing vocals, rhythm guitar, lead guitar
- Brian Jones – Mellotron
- Bill Wyman – bass
- Charlie Watts – drums

Additional musicians

- Nicky Hopkins – piano
- John Lennon – backing vocals
- Paul McCartney – backing vocals

Technical staff

- Andrew Loog Oldham – producer
- Glyn Johns – sound engineer
- Eddie Kramer – assistant engineer

== Charts ==
Chart (1967)	Peak position
Austria (Ö3 Austria Top 40)	5
Belgium (Ultratop 50 Flanders)	14
Netherlands (Dutch Top 40)	1
Finland (Soumen Virallinen)	31
Germany (GfK)	2
Ireland (IRMA)	14
Italy (Musica e dischi)	10
Norway (VG-lista)	9
Sweden (Kvällstoppen)	5
UK Singles (Official Charts)	8
US Billboard Hot 100	50

== Cover versions ==
The Japanese musician Ryuichi Sakamoto covered the song on his 1989 album Beauty, with vocals by Robert Wyatt and Brian Wilson. One-time Sparks bassist Martin Gordon released a version on his first solo album The Baboon in the Basement in 2003.
