= Dandelion (Rolling Stones song) =

- US picture sleeve

Single by the Rolling Stones
- A-side: "We Love You" (UK)
- B-side: "We Love You" (US)
- Released: 18 August 1967 (UK); 2 September 1967 (US)
- Recorded: 13, 21 June, 2 and 19 July 1967
- Studio: Olympic, London
- Genre: Psychedelic pop; psychedelic rock
- Length: 3:48
- Label: Decca (UK); London (US)
- Songwriter: Jagger–Richards
- Producer: Andrew Loog Oldham

The Rolling Stones UK singles chronology
"Let's Spend the Night Together" / "Ruby Tuesday" (1967)	"We Love You" / "Dandelion" (1967)	"Jumpin' Jack Flash" (1968)

The Rolling Stones US singles chronology
"Let's Spend the Night Together" / "Ruby Tuesday" (1967)	"Dandelion" (1967)	"She's a Rainbow" (1967)

"Dandelion" is a song by the English rock band the Rolling Stones, written by Mick Jagger and Keith Richards, and first released as a B-side to "We Love You" in August 1967. As recently as October 2023 Keith Richards confirmed that John Lennon and Paul McCartney sing backing vocals. Billboard described the single as "an easy beat rocker with good story line."

== Background ==
The song has lyrical references to British counting or nursery rhymes. The first demo version of "Dandelion" was recorded in November 1966. Originally titled "Sometimes Happy, Sometimes Blue", it had different lyrics and was sung and played by Keith Richards. On the released version, Mick Jagger sings the lead vocal.

The recording's arrangement makes use of baroque instrumentation; Brian Jones contributed a distinctive melodic figure played on Mellotron, while Nicky Hopkins performed on harpsichord. The two parts move in contrary motion, with Jones' melody ascending against Hopkins' descending pedal point. The song is in the key of B-flat major and in the 4/4 time signature.

In a letter to Robert Creeley dated 28 November 1967, Allen Ginsberg describes watching the recording: "spent a lot of evenings with Mick Jagger singing mantras and talking economics and law-politics during his court crisis — found him very delicate and friendly, reading Poe and Aleister Crowley — on thick carpets with incense and wearing ruffled lace at home — later spent nite in recording studio with Jagger, Lennon and McCartney composing and fixing voices on pretty song “Dandelion Fly Away” everybody exhilarated with hashish – all of them drest in paisley and velvet and earnestly absorbed in heightening the harmonic sounds inch by inch on tape, turning to piano to figure out sweeter variations and returning to microphone to try it out – lovely scene thru control booth window, I got so happy I began conducting like a madman thru the plate glass."

The Rolling Stones have never performed "Dandelion" live; nonetheless it has been included on several compilations, including Through the Past, Darkly (Big Hits Vol. 2), More Hot Rocks (Big Hits & Fazed Cookies), Singles Collection: The London Years, and Rolled Gold+: The Very Best of the Rolling Stones.

The original single release fades out with a brief section of the Nicky Hopkins piano intro from the A-side, "We Love You". The coda is missing on most versions of "Dandelion" appearing on compilation albums, which include the song in a 3:32 edit, but it may be heard, for example, in the 3:48 version included on Singles Collection: The London Years but not Through The Past, Darkly.

== Personnel ==
According to authors Philippe Margotin and Jean-Michel Guesdon, except where noted:

The Rolling Stones

- Mick Jagger – vocals, maracas
- Keith Richards – backing vocals, acoustic guitar
- Brian Jones – Mellotron, saxophone
- Bill Wyman – bass
- Charlie Watts – drums

Additional personnel

- Nicky Hopkins – harpsichord
- John Lennon – backing vocals
- Paul McCartney – backing vocals

== Charts ==
"Dandelion" reached number eight on the UK Singles Chart and number 14 on the US Billboard 100 singles chart.

Chart (1967)	Peak position
Netherlands (Dutch Top 40) - double A-side with We Love You	1
UK Singles (Official Charts)	8
US Billboard Hot 100	14
