= Cock Sparrer =

British punk rock band

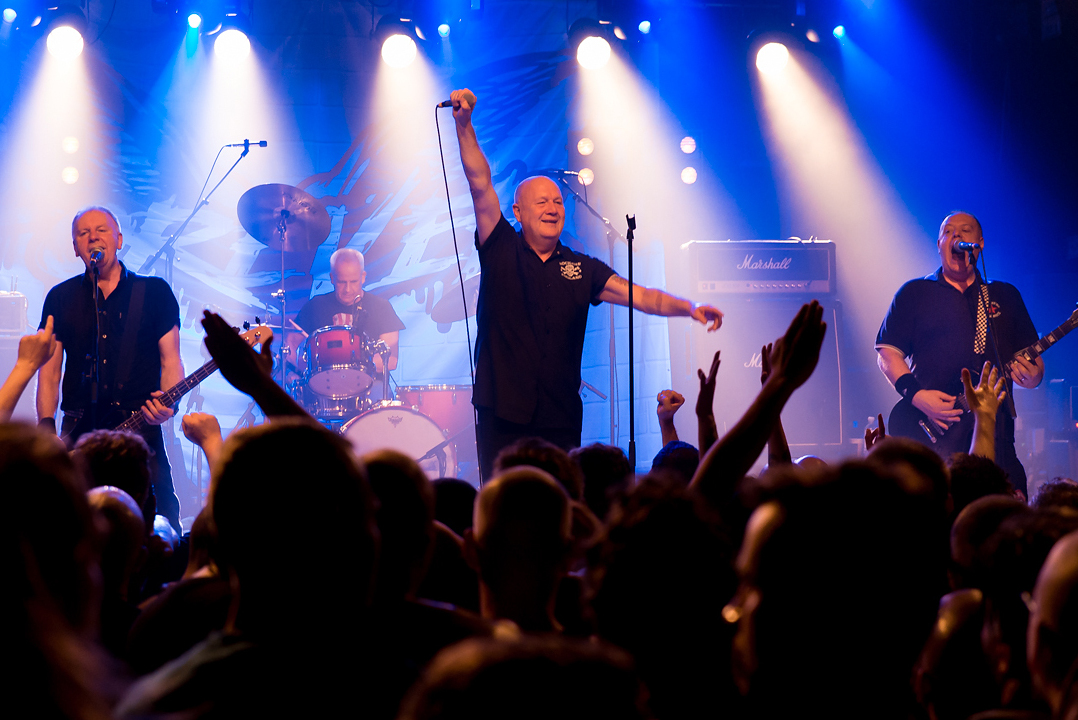
- Cock Sparrer live in Berlin, 2017

Background information
- Also known as: Cock Sparrow
- Origin: London, England
- Genres: Punk rock, Oi!
- Years active: 1972–1978, 1982–1984, 1992–present
- Labels: Decca, Carrere, Razor, Bitzcore, Captain Oi!, Pirates Press, Cherry Red Records
- Members: Colin McFaull; Mickey Beaufoy; Steve Burgess; Steve Bruce; Daryl Smith
- Past members: Gary Lammin; Chris Skepis; Shug O'Neill
- Website: cocksparrer.co.uk

Cock Sparrer (/ˈkɒk spærə/) is an English punk rock band formed in 1972 in the East End of London. Although they have never enjoyed commercial success, they helped pave the way for the early '80s punk scene and the Oi! subgenre. Their songs have been covered by many punk, Oi!, and hardcore punk bands.

Their style is influenced by pub rock, glam rock and raw 1960s beat music as delivered by bands like the Small Faces and The Who. Their lyrics mostly deal with topics related to the daily lives of working class people. Their name derives from their original name, Cock Sparrow, a Cockney term of familiarity.

== Career ==
Cock Sparrer was founded by Colin McFaull, Mick Beaufoy, Steve "Burge" Burgess and Steve Bruce – who had known each other since the age of 11. Playing in nightclubs in and around London, they developed the style that was later to be known as streetpunk or Oi!, mixed with pub rock/R&B influences. In 1976, Garrie Lammin (Burge's cousin) joined as second guitarist, and the band met with Malcolm McLaren, who was considering managing Cock Sparrer alongside the Sex Pistols.

In 1977, the band secured a deal with Decca Records, who were hoping to cash in on the now blooming punk movement. The first Cock Sparrer single was "Runnin' Riot", released in May 1977. It did not sell well, nor did the following single (a cover of the Rolling Stones' "We Love You"), and Decca dropped the band in 1978. The band members had already recorded an album's worth of material, which was only released in Spain as Cock Sparrer and was not officially issued in the UK until Razor Records released it in 1987 as True Grit. Cock Sparrer ceased activity in late 1978, with Lammin leaving the group.

In 1981, old Cock Sparrer songs were included on several Oi! compilation albums, and interest in the band began to rise again. They reformed in 1982 – with Chris Skepis replacing Gary Lammin as second guitarist – and signed to Carrere Records, which released the "England Belongs to Me" single. The next release was the band's debut album Shock Troops in 1983. It included the songs "Where Are They Now", "I Got Your Number" and "Riot Squad". Beaufoy then left the band and was replaced by Shug O'Neill. Third album Running Riot in '84 was released in October 1984, after which the band ceased activity once more, although a "live" album recorded around this time was released in 1987.

The band performed several reunion concerts in 1992 (with Beaufoy returning and Daryl Smith coming in as long-term replacement for O'Neill), and in 1994 they released a new album, Guilty as Charged. In 1997, they released the album Two Monkeys. Since then, Cock Sparrer has occasionally toured and has performed sporadically at punk festivals including the Wasted/Rebellion festival. The band released their sixth studio album, Here We Stand, in November 2007. In April 2008 they headlined Rebellion Vienna and also headlined Rebellion Blackpool in August 2008. The following year Cock Sparrer headlined the Punk & Disorderly-Festival in Berlin. They also played Riot Fest in Chicago playing at the Congress Theater on 10/10/09 and headlined at the Metro on 10/11/09. They returned to play Riot Fest again in 2014.

In 2012, Cock Sparrer marked their 40th anniversary along with Rancid who were celebrating their 20th anniversary. They played five sold-out concerts in the United States (two in Philadelphia, one in Boston, and two in San Francisco) and headlined the Christmas Bash in Birmingham as part of the Rebellion Festival on 8 December 2012.

The band's seventh album Forever was released in mid-2017.

In December 2023, it was announced Cock Sparrer would release their eighth studio album Hand on Heart in April 2024 on Cherry Red Records. The album was produced by James Bragg, who also produced their previous record Forever. In the run up to the album's release, the band released music videos for the songs "Here We Stand", "With My Hand on My Heart" and "I Belong to You".

== In popular culture ==
UFC fighter Dan Hardy has used the song "England Belongs to Me" as his walk-out music. "Take 'em All" has a long history of being sung by Major League Soccer supporter groups, including the Empire Supporters Club, Garden State Ultras And Viking Army Supporters Club for the New York Red Bulls and the Emerald City Supporters for the Seattle Sounders FC. In 2022, the Seattle supporters ceased using the song after the Robb Elementary School shooting. It has also been sung by SK Sturm Graz fans after accomplishments such as a Championship or cup title. "I Got Your Number" Was used in the Jet engine segment of the 2010 comedy film Jackass 3D.

== Members ==
=== Current members ===
- Colin McFaull – vocals (1972–1978, 1982–1984, 1992–present)
- Mick Beaufoy – lead guitar and backing vocals (1972–1978, 1982-1983, 1992–present)
- Daryl Smith – rhythm guitar and backing vocals (1992–present)
- Steve Burgess – bass guitar and backing vocals (1972–1978, 1982–1984, 1992–present)
- Steve Bruce – drums (1972–1978, 1982–1984, 1992–present)

=== Former members ===
- Garrie Lammin – rhythm guitar (1976–1978)
- Chris Skepis – rhythm guitar (1982–1984)
- Shug O'Neill – lead guitar (1983–1984)

== Discography ==
=== Albums ===
Title	Label	Date of release	Notes
Cock Sparrer	Decca [Spain]	1978	Released in the UK as True Grit in 1987
Shock Troops	Razor	1983	
Running Riot in '84	Syndicate	1984	
Guilty as Charged	Bitzcore	1994	
Two Monkeys	Bitzcore	1997	
Here We Stand	Captain Oi!	2007	
Forever	Chase the Ace Records	2017	
Hand on Heart	Cherry Red	2024	Their first album to make the UK Albums Chart, peaking at #96.

=== 10" EP ===
- Run Away EP (1995), Bitzcore

=== Live albums ===
- Live and Loud (1987), Link
- Live: Runnin' Riot Across the USA (2000)
- Back Home (2003), Captain Oi!
- Back in San Francisco - Live 2009 (2010), Pirates Press

=== Compilations ===
- Sunday Stripper (1980), Oi the Album
- Rarities (1995), Captain Oi!
- Rumours Carry More Weight Than Fact (The Best of Cock Sparrer) (1996), Step-1
- England Belongs to Me (1997), Harry May
- Bloody Minded (1999), Dr. Strange/Bitzcore
- The Best of Cock Sparrer (2004), Recall 2 cd
- The Decca Years (2006), Captain Oi!
- 40 Years (2012), Captain Oi!

=== 7" singles ===
- "Running Riot" b/w "Sister Suzie" (1977), Decca
- "We Love You" b/w "Chip on My Shoulder" (1977), Decca
- "England Belongs to Me" b/w "Argy Bargy" (1982), Carerre
- "Run Away" (1995), Bitzcore
- "Too Late" b/w "Because You're Young" (2007), Captain Oi!
- "Did You Have a Nice Life Without Me?" b/w "So Many Things" (2008), Dirty Punk (French Import)
- "True to Yourself" b/w "Chip on My Shoulder (Live)" (2008), TKO Records
- "Spirit of '76" [one-sided flexidisc] (2008), Pirates Press Records
- "England Belongs to Me" 30th Anniversary Split w/ Rancid (2012), Pirates Press Records
- Contender" b/w "Up With This"
