= Running Riot in '84 =

Studio album by Cock Sparrer
- Released: 1984
- Genre: Punk rock
- Length: 34:51 (1996 CD reissue)
- Label: Syndicate

Cock Sparrer chronology
Shock Troops (1982)	Running Riot in '84 (1984)	Live and Loud (1987)

Professional ratings
Review scores
Source	Rating
AllMusic	3.5/5 stars

Running Riot in '84 is punk rock band Cock Sparrer's third studio album, released in 1984.

== Track listing ==
All titles written by Cock Sparrer

1. "Run with the Blind"
2. "Is Anybody There?"
3. "Price Too High to Pay"
4. "Think Again"
5. "Don't Say a Word"
6. "The Sun Says"
7. "They Mean Murder"
8. "Closedown"
9. "Chip on my Shoulder" (live)
10. "Runnin' Riot" (live)
11. "The Sun Says" (Oi! LP version) (1996 CD Bonus Track)

== Personnel ==
- Colin McFaul − vocals
- Steve Burgess − bass
- Steve Bruce − drums
- Shugs O'Neil − lead guitar
- Chris Skepis − rhythm guitar

== Release history ==
Region	Date	Label	Format	Catalog	Notes
UK	1984	Syndicate Records	LP	SYN LP 7	10-track
UK	1988	Link Records	LP	LINK LP 032	10-track, released as "Running Riot"
UK	1993	Step-1 Music	CD	STEP CD 028	10-track + Shock Troops
UK	1996	Captain Oi! Records	CD	AHOY 57	11-track
US	2001	Taang! Records	CD	TAANG! 153	11-track + Live and Loud
US	2010	Pirates Press Records	LP	PPR028	10-track
