= Ookla the Mok (band) =

American filk band

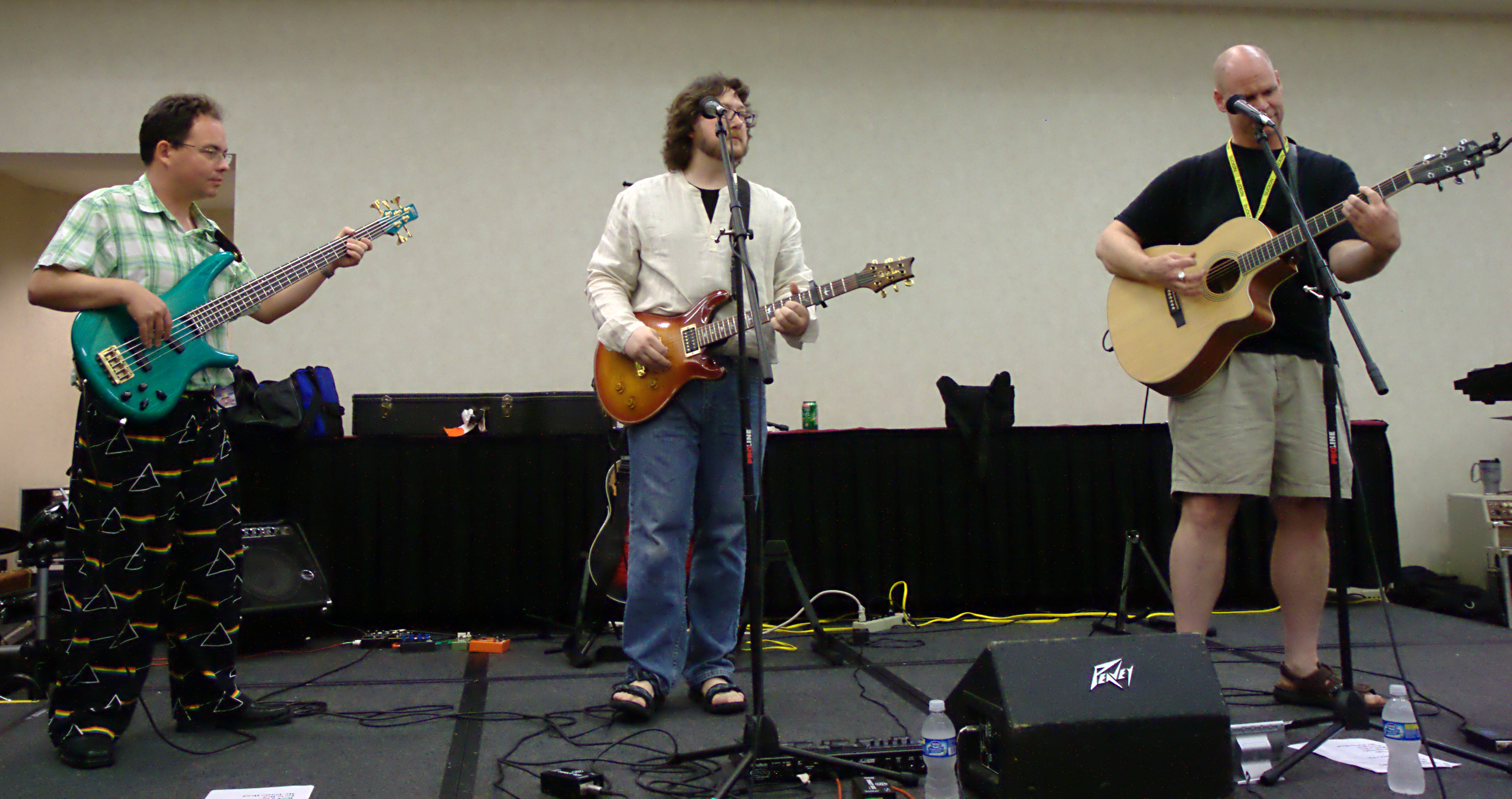
- Ookla the Mok at DucKon, 2008

Background information
- Genre: Filk
- Members: Rand Bellavia (1992–present); Adam English (1992–present)

Ookla the Mok is a filk band fronted by Rand Bellavia and Adam English (b. 1970). The two met as undergraduates while attending Houghton College in 1988, and the majority of their performances have been at science-fiction conventions or in their hometown of Buffalo, New York. The band is named after a character from the Ruby-Spears Productions cartoon Thundarr the Barbarian, created by Steve Gerber.

They provided the theme song to Disney's Fillmore!, and scored the feature film, Bite Me, Fanboy! They have won four Pegasus Awards for excellence in filk music, and the 2014 Logan Award for Outstanding Original Comedy Song ("Mwahaha"). Ookla the Mok had the most requested song on Dr. Demento's syndicated radio show in both 2012 ("Tantric Yoda") and 2013 ("Mwahaha"). Two of their songs ("Stop Talking About Comic Books or I'll Kill You" and "F. People") have appeared on Dr. Demento CD compilations.

On Dr. Demento's final episode, Ookla the Mok was listed as the 32nd most requested artist of all time, and "Mwahaha" was the 63rd most requested song

On April 20, 2024, Rand Bellavia and Adam English were inducted into the Filk Hall of Fame.

== Band members ==
The band consists of a core duo of Rand Bellavia and Adam English, who met as undergraduates at Houghton College in 1988. Although Bellavia and English continue to perform live with Luis Garcia and Mike Mallory if geography and convention budgets allow for it (most recently at Windycon, 2016), performances are generally two-piece sets.

Bellavia works as the library director at D'Youville University, while English makes his living as a caricature and cartoon artist. English previously founded and managed "Adam English's Cartoon City Caricatures" at Darien Lake Theme Park Resort (now Six Flags Darien Lake), as well as teaching workshops on cartooning in Buffalo Public Schools through the Arts-in-Education program.

=== Former ===
- Luis Garcia – drums, vocals (1994–1998)
- Michael Mallory – bass (1996–2003, 2010–2013)
- Doug White – bass, guitar (1997–2001)
- Chris Gajewski – drums (1999–2003)
- Joe Pepper – drums (2005–2007)
- Wolfram Neff – bass (2006–2009)
- Jeremy Stock – bass (2014–2015)

== Musical style ==
Although Ookla the Mok has released many songs about more universal topics like relationships and lost love, they are best known for "filk" songs that cater to the interests of listeners at science fiction and comic book conventions, where the band makes the bulk of their public appearances.

For example, their song "Arthur Curry" from Less Than Art pokes fun at Aquaman and the way his super-powers do not seem to compare favourably with the rest of the Super Friends. Another example is "Stop Talking About Comic Books Or I'll Kill You" from Super Secret. "Song of Kong" from Smell No Evil takes a tongue-in-cheek look at the relationship between King Kong and Godzilla. "W.W.S.D.?" from oh okay LA asks its listeners to ask themselves "What would Scooby do?". "Mr. W" from the same album paints a nightmare scenario of Worf being in command of Star Trek's starship Enterprise. "Spot The Cat" from Dave Lennon sets to music a poem originally read by Star Trek's Data (written by Clay Dale). Tribute songs about celebrities Gary Coleman, Michael Jackson, Cher, and Sting also appear on oh okay LA. A song in the 2013 album vs. Evil is based on the Marvel Comics character Kang the Conqueror.

== Other appearances ==
Bellavia's voice and English's keyboards can be heard on the international top five hit "Cupid's Chokehold" by Gym Class Heroes.

== Performances ==
Ookla the Mok were the music guests of honor at Marcon (convention) (1998), Fanzillacon (2003), OVFF (2004), MarsCon (2007), Consonance (2013), Con on the Cob (2013), ConGlomeration (2014), FenCon (2014), Windycon (2016), and Archon (2018), as well as the Overseas Guests at the 2009 British Filk Convention (aXXIdental).

== Discography (including solo albums and side projects) ==
- Poor Man's Copyright [pre-Ookla the Mok album released under the name "Rand and Adam"] (1993)
- Less Than Art (1997)
- Super Secret (1998)
- Sucking Out Loud: Ookla the Mok Live at Windycon 25 (1999)
- The Rand and Adam Tape [Ookla the Mok branded release of Poor Man's Copyright] (1999)
- Smell No Evil (2001)
- Full Frontal Nerdity [limited edition rarities compilation] (2002)
- oh okay LA (2003)
- Sketched Out [Adam English solo EP] (2005)
- Dave Lennon [b-sides collection] (2005)
- OtheM! [limited edition compilation] (2006)
- Less Than Art 10th Anniversary Edition (2007)
- Nerdvana EP (2012)
- vs. Evil (2013)
- Live at Windycon [double album] (2017)
- The Way of Beauty [Via Bella - Rand Bellavia side project] (2018)
- The Tips of My Fingers [Rand Bellavia solo album] (2021)
- Lukewarm: Rarities, 1993-2016 (2022)
- The Elbows EP [Rand Bellavia solo EP] (2022)
- Live in Germany [Via Bella] (2024)
- Folk Song Army Men (2025)
- The Hope EP [Via Bella] (2025)
