= Guilty as Charged (Cock Sparrer album) =

Guilty As Charged

Studio album by Cock Sparrer
- Released: 1994
- Genre: Punk rock
- Length: 43:03
- Label: Bitzcore

Cock Sparrer chronology
Live and Loud (1987)	Guilty As Charged (1994)	Two Monkeys (1997)

Professional ratings
Review scores
Source	Rating
Allmusic	4/5 stars

Guilty as Charged is punk rock band Cock Sparrer's fourth studio album, released in 1994 on Bitzcore Records. The album was re-released on 24 February 2009, in a remixed and partially rerecorded form on Captain Oi! Records.

== Track listing ==
1. "Get a Rope"
2. "Because You're Young"
3. "Bird Trouble"
4. "Don't Blame Us"
5. "Roads to Freedom"
6. "Last Train to Dagenham"
7. "I Fit Central Heating (Working Pt. 2)"
8. "Strip"
9. "Crack in the Mirror"
10. "We Know How to Live"
11. "Tough Guys"
  2009 reissue bonus tracks:
12. "Runaway Johnny"
13. "Why Can't You See?"
14. "Sunday Stripper" (1995 version)
15. "Roads to Freedom" (full version)
