= Guilty as Charged (song) =

Single by Gym Class Heroes featuring Estelle

from the album The Quilt
- Released: December 1, 2008
- Recorded: 2008
- Genre: Funk rock; alternative rock; R&B
- Length: 4:00
- Label: Decaydance, Fueled by Ramen
- Songwriter: Gym Class Heroes
- Producer: Patrick Stump

Gym Class Heroes singles chronology
| "Cookie Jar" (2008) | "Guilty as Charged" (2008) | "Stereo Hearts" (2011) |

Estelle singles chronology
| "Come Over" (2008) | "Guilty as Charged" (2008) | "Star" (2009) |

Music video
- "Guilty as Charged" on YouTube

"Guilty as Charged" is the third single from Gym Class Heroes' fourth full-length album, The Quilt.

It was released for digital download release on December 1, 2008 in the UK, it features UK R&B singer Estelle singing the chorus and a go-go beat for backing.

It was added to BBC Radio 1's C-List on November 12, 2008. The song peaked at No. 9 on the Official R&B chart in the UK.

== Charts ==
| Chart (2008) | Peak position |
|---|---|
| UK R&B Chart | 9 |
