= Cupid's Chokehold =

2005 song by Gym Class Heroes

Single by Gym Class Heroes featuring Patrick Stump

from the album The Papercut Chronicles and As Cruel as School Children
- Released: 2005
- Length: 4:03 (The Papercut Chronicles version); 3:58 (As Cruel as School Children version)
- Label: Decaydance; Fueled by Ramen
- Songwriters: Travis McCoy; Rick Davies; Roger Hodgson
- Producer: S*A*M

Gym Class Heroes singles chronology
"Papercuts" (2005)	"Cupid's Chokehold" (2005)	"The Queen and I" (2006)

Gym Class Heroes singles chronology
"New Friend Request" (2006)	"Cupid's Chokehold" (2006)	"Shoot Down the Stars" (2007)

Music video
- "Cupid's Chokehold" on YouTube

"Cupid's Chokehold" is a song by American rap rock band Gym Class Heroes, featuring the vocals of Patrick Stump of Fall Out Boy. The song relies heavily on the melody and chorus from Supertramp's song "Breakfast in America" written by Roger Hodgson and Rick Davies.

Gym Class Heroes first released "Cupid's Chokehold" on their album The Papercut Chronicles (2005). It was reissued on the album As Cruel as School Children (2006), which was released as a single on November 4, 2006, along with a new music video. It peaked at No. 4 on the Billboard Hot 100 in 2007, No. 1 on the Billboard Mainstream Top 40 radio chart, No. 3 on the UK Singles Chart and the Canadian Hot 100.

== Overview ==
Gym Class Heroes initially released "Cupid's Chokehold" on their 2005 album The Papercut Chronicles, but it attracted little attention. The band returned to the song for their 2006 album As Cruel as School Children after it began to gain airplay when the radio station WXSS-FM in Greater Milwaukee added it to its rotation. "I always knew 'Cupid's' had potential," McCoy said to Newsday. "I think people are sick of bands banking off brokenhearted-ness. It's time for a song about how awesome girls can be."

The song was featured on Discover and Download and Total Request Live. It won an ASCAP award on April 9, 2008, for being one of the most-played songs in the ASCAPs repertory from the end of 2006 through the end of 2007. As of September 2011, the song has sold 1,936,000 digital downloads.

In 2021, "Cupid's Chokehold" went viral on TikTok, appearing in more than 350,000 videos. In March, the song received over 12 million streams, 800% increase from February, propelling Gym Class Heroes to a career high No. 388 on Rolling Stone's Artist 500 chart.

== Composition ==
Drummer Matt McGinley described the song's creation as an accident, explaining that the band had gathered to rehearse rather write new material. Their friend Sie One (Steve Decker) played the chorus of Supertramp's "Breakfast in America," singing "Take a look at my girlfriend, she's the only one I got." The band developed their own bridge around the chorus, and, McGinley recalled, "that song happened really, really quickly. And then we went and recorded it for under $300 in probably 3 or 4 hours."

They couldn't clear the sample for "Breakfast in America," so labelmate Patrick Stump of Fall Out Boy sang the chorus. The first version is a slower tempo and includes female backing vocals throughout the song. The second version includes vocals from Rand Bellavia of Ookla the Mok.

== Music videos ==
=== The Papercut Chronicles version ===
The first version of the "Cupid's Chokehold" music video, directed by Andrew Paul Bowser for the album The Papercut Chronicles, features Travie McCoy working at a toy factory, where he discovers a life-size prototype doll that becomes his girlfriend and fulfills his wishes. The relationship deteriorates when the doll grows tired of being exploited, humorously spelling out "krush," "kill," and "destroy" during a game of Scrabble. After she begins malfunctioning, McCoy pushes her off a bridge. At the end of the video, Patrick Stump awakens the doll, revealing himself to be a robot as well. The two fall in love and walk down the road together. This version features repeated background vocals of the word "girlfriend," which does not appear in the second version of the song.

=== As Cruel as School Children version ===
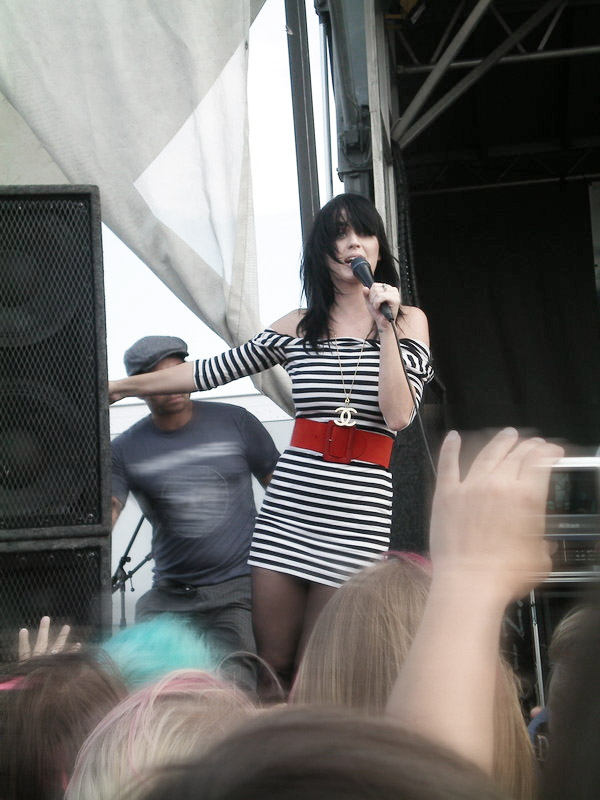
Katy Perry (pictured in 2008), who was dating McCoy, starred as his "ideal girlfriend" in the 2006 "Cupid's Chokehold" music video.

The second version of "Cupid's Chokehold" was directed by Alan Ferguson for the album As Cruel as School Children. It follows the lyrics more literally than the original and became the more widely recognized version thorough airplay on MTV and VH1.

The video begins with a Krump dancing Cupid, portrayed by Princetón, shooting McCoy with a love arrow as he passes a woman played by actress Porscha Coleman. Patrick Stump watches from behind a newspaper. McCoy and the woman initially all in love, but their relationship ends after she discovers him gambling with his friends. Cupid then matches McCoy with another woman, but their relationship also fails after he disrupts a party by performing a part of "Wejusfreestylin Pt. 2" from The Papercut Chronicles, and he later finds her in a compromised position with a masked man.

McCoy's final relationship is with a fan, who was played by his real life girlfriend Katy Perry. The two meet at a bar, and a romance develops without Cupid needing to shoot McCoy again. In the closing scene, a female Cupid shoots Cupid with an arrow, and the two dance as McCoy and Perry watch.

In the United Kingdom, some music channels aired an edited version of the video the substantially cut the party scene.

== Charts ==
=== Weekly charts ===
Chart (2007)	Peak position
Australia (ARIA)	14
Austria (Ö3 Austria Top 40)	42
Belgium (Ultratip Bubbling Under Flanders)	7
Canada Hot 100 (Billboard)	3
Czech Republic Airplay (ČNS IFPI)	65
Denmark (Tracklisten)	34
Europe (Eurochart Hot 100)	11
Finland (Suomen virallinen lista)	9
France (SNEP)	7
Germany (GfK)	45
Hungary (Rádiós Top 40)	2
Ireland (IRMA)	3
Italy (FIMI)	12
Netherlands (Dutch Top 40)	9
Netherlands (Single Top 100)	29
New Zealand (Recorded Music NZ)	6
Russia Airplay (TopHit)	6
Scottish Singles Sales (Official Charts)	5
Slovakia Airplay (ČNS IFPI)	48
Sweden (Sverigetopplistan)	38
Switzerland (Schweizer Hitparade)	34
UK Singles (Official Charts)	3
UK Hip Hop/R&B (Official Charts)	2
US Billboard Hot 100	4
US Adult Pop Airplay (Billboard)	18
US Pop Airplay (Billboard)	1

Chart (2020–2021)	Peak position
Czech Republic Singles Digital (ČNS IFPI)	68
Global 200 (Billboard)	118
Poland Airplay (ZPAV)	100
Slovakia (Singles Digitál Top 100)	70

=== Year-end charts ===
Chart (2007)	Position
Australia (ARIA)	72
Europe (Eurochart Hot 100)	86
Hungary (Rádiós Top 40)	5
Netherlands (Dutch Top 40)	46
New Zealand (RIANZ)	45
Russia Airplay (TopHit)	39
UK Singles (OCC)	27
US Billboard Hot 100	23

Chart (2008)	Position
Hungary (Rádiós Top 40)	88

=== Decade-end charts ===
Chart (2000–2009)	Position
Russia Airplay (TopHit)	130

== Certifications ==
Region	Certification	Certified units/sales
Canada (Music Canada)	3× Platinum	240,000^{‡}
New Zealand (RMNZ)	2× Platinum	60,000^{‡}
United Kingdom (BPI)	Platinum	600,000^{‡}
United States (RIAA)	5× Platinum	5,000,000^{‡}
^{‡} Sales+streaming figures based on certification alone.

== Release history ==
Format	Release date
North America (original release)	March 2005
North America (re-release)	December 19, 2006
France	April 30, 2007
United Kingdom	April 2, 2007

== Covers ==
UK happy hardcore producers Darren Styles and Whizzkid covered the song in 2007, this version being simply titled 'Girlfriend', which got an extended release on vinyl in 2009.
