= Stooshe discography =

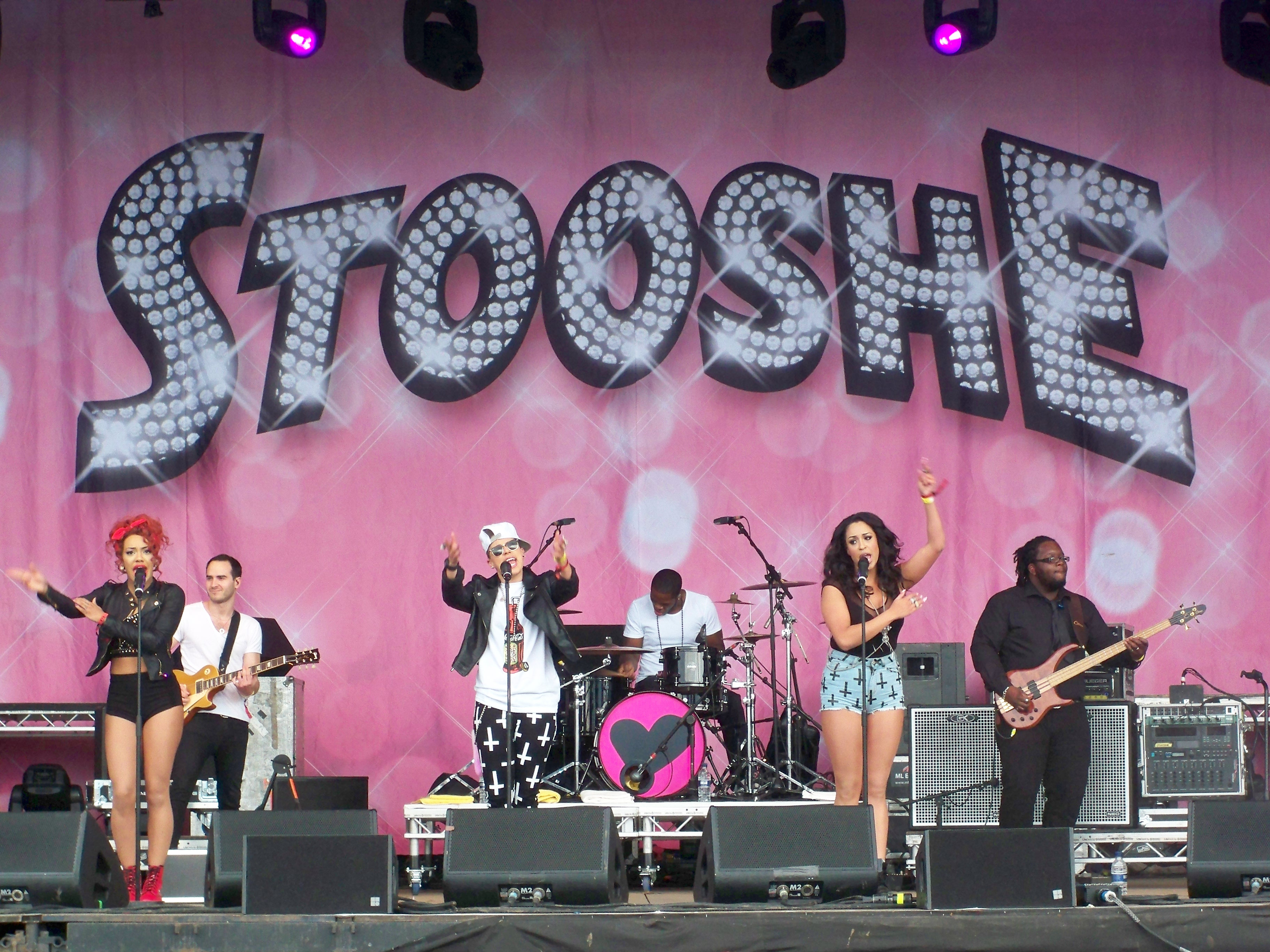
- Stooshe performing at Guilfest in 2012
- Studio albums: 1
- Singles: 8
- Music videos: 10
- Mixtapes: 1
- Promotional singles: 1

The discography of British girl-group Stooshe consists of one studio album, one mixtape, eight singles (including one promotional track and one as a featured artist) and ten music videos. The group released their debut single, "Love Me" featuring Travie McCoy, in March 2012; where it debuted at number five on the UK chart. A second single, "Black Heart", was released in June 2012; peaking at number three. In November 2012, the group released "Waterfalls", a cover version of the TLC song. Stooshe released "Slip" on 12 May, shortly before their debut studio album London with the Lights On on 27 May. The fourth single from the album, "My Man Music", was released on 28 July 2013. The group's next single "Lock Down" was released on 15 January 2016, followed by "Let It Go" on 1 July 2016.

== Albums ==
=== Studio albums ===
List of albums, with selected chart positions, sales, and certifications
Title	Details	Peak chart positions		
Title	Details	UK	IRE	SCO
London with the Lights On	Released: 27 May 2013; Label: Warner Music UK; Format: CD, digital download	8	30	9

=== Mixtapes ===
Title	Details
The Stoosh Tape	Released: 23 October 2011; Label: Warner Music UK; Format: Digital download

== Singles ==
=== As lead artist ===
Title	Year	Peak chart positions				Certifications	Album
Title	Year	UK	BEL	IRE	SCO	Certifications	Album
"Love Me" (featuring Travie McCoy)	2012	5	133 (Note: "Love Me" did not enter the Ultratop 50, but peaked at number 83 on the Flemish Ultratip chart.)	—	7	BPI: Silver	London with the Lights On
"Black Heart"	2012	3	78 (Note: "Black Heart" did not enter the Ultratop 50, but peaked at number 28 on the Flemish Ultratip chart.)	4	4	BPI: Platinum	London with the Lights On
"Waterfalls"	2012	21	—	44	20		Non-album single
"Slip"	2013	12	—	58	12		London with the Lights On
"My Man Music"	2013	140	—	—	—		London with the Lights On
"Lock Down"	2016	—	—	—	—		Non-album singles
"Let It Go"	2016	—	—	—	—		Non-album singles
"—" denotes a recording that did not chart or was not released.

=== As featured artist ===
Single	Year	Notes
"Wish I Belonged" (Urban Classic featuring Fazer, BBC Symphony Orchestra, Angel, Stooshe & Tyler James)	2012	To raise funds for Children in Need.

=== Promotional singles ===
Title	Year	Album
"Betty Woz Gone"	2011	Non-album Single

== Music videos ==
Year	Song	Director	References
2011	"Fuck Me" (featuring Suave Debonair)	MoonRunners	
2011	"Hot Stepper"	MoonRunners	
2011	"Betty Woz Gone" (lyric video)	Jess Gorick and Tom Oswald	
2012	"Love Me" (featuring Travie McCoy)	Matt Stawski	
2012	"Black Heart"	Matt Stawski	
2012	"Waterfalls"	Matt Stawski	
2013	"Slip"	Bryan Barber	
2013	"My Man Music"	Courtney Phillips	
2015	"Lock Down"	Damien Sandoval	
2016	"Let It Go"	Damien Sandoval	
