= Let It Go (disambiguation) =

"Let It Go" is a song from Disney's 2013 animated feature film Frozen.

Let It Go may also refer to:

== Music ==
=== Albums ===
- Let It Go (The Clarks album) or the title song, 2000
- Let It Go (Galactic Cowboys album), 2000
- Let It Go (House Shoes album) or the title song, 2012
- Let It Go (Josh Nelson album) or the title track, 2007
- Let It Go (Stanley Turrentine album) or the title track, 1966
- Let It Go (State Radio album) or the title song, 2009
- Let It Go (Tim McGraw album) or the title song (see below), 2007
- Let It Go (Will Young album) or the title song (see below), 2008
- Let It Go, by Clair Marlo, 1989
- Let It Go, by The Infamous Stringdusters, 2014
- Let It Go, by Norman Brown, 2017

=== EPs ===
- Let It Go (EP), by Heo Young Saeng, 2011
- Let It Go, or the title song (see below), by James Bay, 2014

=== Songs ===
- "Let It Go" (Alexandra Burke song), 2012
- "Let It Go" (Anna Rossinelli song), 2013
- "Let It Go" (Brit & Alex song), 2008
- "Let It Go" (Def Leppard song), 1981
- "Let It Go" (Devlin song), 2011
- "Let It Go" (DJ Khaled song), 2021
- "Let It Go" (Dragonette song), 2012
- "Let It Go!", by F.T. Island, 2011
- "Let It Go" (Fe song), 2013
- "Let It Go" (George Strait song), 2015
- "Let It Go" (Jacky Cheung song), 2010
- "Let It Go" (James Bay song), 2014
- "Let It Go" (Keyshia Cole song), 2007
- "Let It Go" (Ray J song), 1997
- "Let It Go" (Tim McGraw song), 2008
- "Let It Go" (Will Young song), 2009
- "Let It Go" (Wiz Khalifa song), 2012
- "Letitgo", by Prince, 1994
- "Let It Go", by Ai featuring Snoop Dogg from The Last Ai, 2010
- "Let It Go", by Alesha Dixon from Fired Up, 2006
- "Let It Go", by A$AP Ferg from Trap Lord, 2013
- "Let It Go", by the Bangles from Different Light, 1986
- "Let It Go", by the Boxer Rebellion from Ocean by Ocean, 2016
- "Let It Go", by Cavo from Bright Nights Dark Days, 2009
- "Let It Go", by Cormega from Legal Hustle, 2004
- "Let It Go", by Courtney Barnett and Kurt Vile from Lotta Sea Lice, 2017
- "Let It Go", by Day26, 2011
- "Let It Go", by Dirty South, 2007
- "Let It Go", by Dissident Prophet from We're Not Grasshoppers, 1996
- "Let It Go", by Gavin DeGraw from Gavin DeGraw, 2008
- "Let It Go", by Grace Slick from Dreams, 1980
- "Let It Go", by the Grass Roots from More Golden Grass, 1970
- "Let It Go", by Great Big Sea from Something Beautiful*, 2004
- "Let It Go", by Hideki Naganuma from the video game Ollie King, 2004
- "Let It Go", by Kara from Revolution, 2009
- "Let It Go", by KC and the Sunshine Band from KC and the Sunshine Band, 1975
- ”Let It Go”, by Kevin Gates from I'm Him, 2019
- "Let It Go", by Kirk Franklin from Hero, 2005
- "Let It Go", by Krokus from Heart Attack, 1988
- "Let It Go", by Loudness from Lightning Strikes, 1986
- "Let It Go", by Luba from Secrets and Sins, 1984
- "Let It Go", by Melissa O'Neil from Melissa O'Neil, 2005
- "Let It Go", by Mitchel Musso and Tiffany Thornton from Hatching Pete, 2009
- "Let It Go", by the Neighbourhood from I Love You, 2013
- "Let It Go", by Nick Carter, the theme song for House of Carters, 2006
- "Let It Go", by Paco from This Is Where We Live, 2004
- "Let It Go", by Playboi Carti from Playboi Carti, 2017
- "Let It Go", by R3hab, 2018
- "Let It Go", by Scatman John from Everybody Jam!, 1996
- "Let It Go", by Shinhwa from The Return, 2012
- "Let It Go", by Stooshe, 2016
- "Let It Go", by the Story So Far from Proper Dose, 2018
- "Let It Go", by Summer Walker from Life on Earth, 2020
- "Let It Go", by Toto from Falling in Between, 2006
- "Let It Go", by Yuna Ito from Love: Singles Best 2005–2010, 2009
- "Let It Go (Lil Mama)", by Nelly from Brass Knuckles, 2008
- "Let It Go", from the Broadway musical The Full Monty, 2000

== Television ==
- "Let It Go" (The Bill Engvall Show), an episode
- "Let It Go" (Men of a Certain Age), an episode
- "Let It Go" (Private Practice), an episode
- Let It Go, a rejected 2012 sitcom pilot starring Zachary Levi
- Let It Go, a 2015 Singaporean television series starring Jeanette Aw

== Other uses ==
- Let It Go, a comedy album and DVD by Bill Burr, 2010
- Let It Go, a book by T. D. Jakes, 2012

== See also ==
- Let Go (disambiguation)
- Let It All Go (disambiguation)
- Let Her Go (disambiguation)
- Let's Go (disambiguation)
- Letting Go (disambiguation)
- Gotta Let It Go (disambiguation)
