= Let Me Go =

Let Me Go may refer to:

== Songs ==
- "Let Me Go" (3 Doors Down song), 2005
- "Let Me Go" (Avril Lavigne song), 2013
- "Let Me Go" (Cake song), 1998
- "Let Me Go" (Daniel Caesar song), 2023
- "Let Me Go" (Gary Barlow song), 2013
- "Let Me Go" (Hailee Steinfeld and Alesso song), 2017
- "Let Me Go" (Heaven 17 song), 1982
- "Let Me Go" (Maverick Sabre song), 2011
- "Let Me Go", by Benson Boone from Walk Me Home..., 2022
- "Let Me Go", by Good Charlotte from Good Charlotte, 2000
- "Let Me Go", by Jolin Tsai from Lucky Number, 2001
- "Let Me Go", by Marvelous 3 from Hey! Album, 1998
- "Let Me Go", by Melissa Etheridge from Brave and Crazy, 1989
- "Let Me Go", by Rancid from Rancid, 2000
- "Let Me Go", by The Rolling Stones from Emotional Rescue, 1980
- "Let Me Go", by Scott Stapp from The Great Divide, 2005
- "Let Me Go", by Sunrise Avenue from Heartbreak Century, 2017
- "Let Me Go", by Three Dog Night from Three Dog Night, 1968
- "Jaane Do Naa" (lit. 'Let Me Go'), by R. D. Burman, Asha Bhosle and Shailendra Singh from the 1985 Indian film Saagar

== See also ==
- "Let Me Go, Devil", a song written by Jenny Lou Carson and recorded by Georgie Shaw
- Let Me Go, Let Me Go, Let Me Go, an album by Jason Molina
- "Let Me Go, Lover!", a popular song adapted from "Let Me Go, Devil" and first recorded by Joan Weber, recorded by many artists
- Let Go (disambiguation)
- Let It Go (disambiguation)
