= Let Her Go (disambiguation) =

"Let Her Go" is a 2012 song by Passenger.

Let Her Go may also refer to:

== Music ==
- "Let Her Go" (Strawberry Switchblade song), 1985
- "Let Her Go" (Mark Collie song), 1991
- "Let Her Go" (The Kid Laroi song), 2019
- Let Her Go, 2014 EP by Glen Templeton
- "Let Her Go", by 6lack from East Atlanta Love Letter, 2018
- "Let Her Go", by Miss Li from God Put a Rainbow in the Sky, 2007
- "Let Her Go", by The Lodger, 2006
- "Let Her Go", by Lulu on Take Me to Your Heart Again, 1982
- "Let Her Go", by Steve Alaimo from Steve Alaimo Sings and Swings, 1964
- "Let Her Go", by David Cassidy on Old Trick New Dog, 1998
- "Let Her Go", by Don Toliver from Love Sick, 2023
- "Let Her Go", by Blu Cantrell from Bittersweet, 2003
- "Let Her Go", by Gil Grand from Somebody's Someone, 2006
- "Let Her Go", by Point Blank from On a Roll, 1982
- "Let Her Go", by South Korean rock band F.T. Island from Five Treasure Box, 2012
- "Let Her Go", by jazz flautist Hubert Laws from Flute By-Laws, 1966
- "Let Her Go", by Craig David from The Story Goes..., 2005
- "Let Her Go", by Less Than Jake from In with the Out Crowd, 2006
- "Let Her Go", by Cheap Trick from Woke Up with a Monster, 1994
- "Let Her Go", by Dan Fogelberg from Windows and Walls, 1984
- "Let Her Go", by Mac Demarco from Salad Days, 2014

== Television ==
- "Let Her Go", an episode of Life
- "Let Her Go", an episode of Chicago Fire
- "Let Her Go", an episode of The Vampire Diaries

== See also ==
- "Don't Cry, Joe (Let Her Go, Let Her Go, Let Her Go)", 1949 song by Johnny Desmond
- Let It Go (disambiguation)
- Let Me Go (disambiguation)
