= Gotta Let It Go =

Gotta Let It Go may refer to:

- "Gotta Let It Go", a song by Joyce Manor from 40 oz. to Fresno (2022)
- "Gotta Let It Go", a song by Ms. Dynamite from Judgement Days (2005)

== See also ==
- Let It Go (disambiguation)
