= Let Go =

Let Go may refer to:

== Music ==
- Let Go (band), an American rock band

=== Albums ===
- Let Go (Avril Lavigne album), 2002
- Let Go (Bonnie Pink album), 2000
- Let Go (Brother Phelps album) or the title song (see below), 1993
- Let Go (Hundredth album) or the title song, 2011
- Let Go (John Fahey album) or the title song, 1984
- Let Go (KMFDM album) or the title song, 2024
- Let Go (Nada Surf album), 2002
- Let Go (Robert Glasper album) or the title song, 2024
- Let Go (Susie Luchsinger album) or the title song, 2008
- Let Go (Toby Lightman album) or the title song, 2008
- Let Go, by Knower, 2013
- Let Go, an EP by 38th Parallel, 2001

=== Songs ===
- "Let Go" (Brother Phelps song), 1993
- "Let Go" (Central Cee song), 2022
- "Let Go" (Cheap Trick song), 1988
- "Let Go" (deadmau5 song), 2016
- "Let Go" (M-Flo song), 2004
- "Let Go" (Red song), 2007
- "Let Go", by 12 Stones from the film soundtrack Daredevil: The Album
- "Let Go", by Adema from Unstable
- "Let Go", by Against All Will from A Rhyme & Reason
- "Let Go", by Asking Alexandria from Where Do We Go from Here?
- "Let Go", by BarlowGirl from Another Journal Entry
- "Let Go", by Beau Young Prince from the Into the Spider-Verse soundtrack album
- "Let Go", by Blue Öyster Cult from The Revölution by Night
- "Let Go", by Brian Cadd from Moonshine
- "Let Go", by Bury Tomorrow from Will You Haunt Me, with That Same Patience
- "Let Go", by Christina Milian from Christina Milian
- "Let Go", by David Cook from Analog Heart
- "Let Go", by Dean Lewis from Same Kind of Different
- "Let Go", by FireHouse from Prime Time
- "Let Go", by For the Fallen Dreams from Back Burner
- "Let Go", by Foster the People from Paradise State of Mind
- "Let Go", by From Ashes to New from The Future
- "Let Go", by Frou Frou from Details
- "Let Go", by Grey Holiday from The Glorious Revolution
- "Let Go", by Hollywood Undead from Day of the Dead
- "Let Go", by Jacques Greene from Dawn Chorus
- "Let Go", by The Japanese Popstars
- "Let Go", by jj from jj n° 3
- "Let Go", by Lalah Hathaway from Self Portrait
- "Let Go", by Megan Rochell
- "Let Go", by Mia Rose
- "Let Go", by NewDad from Madra
- "Let Go", by Ne-Yo from In My Own Words
- "Let Go", by Paul van Dyk from In Between
- "Let Go", by RAC
- "Let Go", by Redrama from Reflection
- "Let Go", by Ryan Adams from Ryan Adams
- "Let Go", by Saad Lamjarred
- "Let Go", by SafetySuit from These Times
- "Let Go", by the Sandpipers from The Wonder of You, 1969
- "Let Go", by Scuba Dice
- "Let Go", by Shea Couleé from 8, 2023
- "Let Go", by SOiL from True Self
- "Let Go", by Vanessa Hudgens from V
- "Let Go (The Last Chapter)", by Sentenced from Frozen

== Film and television ==
- Let Go (film), a 2011 comedy starring David Denman
- Let Go, a 2006 TV sitcom pilot starring Bonnie Hunt

== See also ==
- Letgo, a mobile classifieds app
- Let It Go (disambiguation)
- Let's Go (disambiguation)
- Letting Go (disambiguation)
