= Stooshe =

English girl group

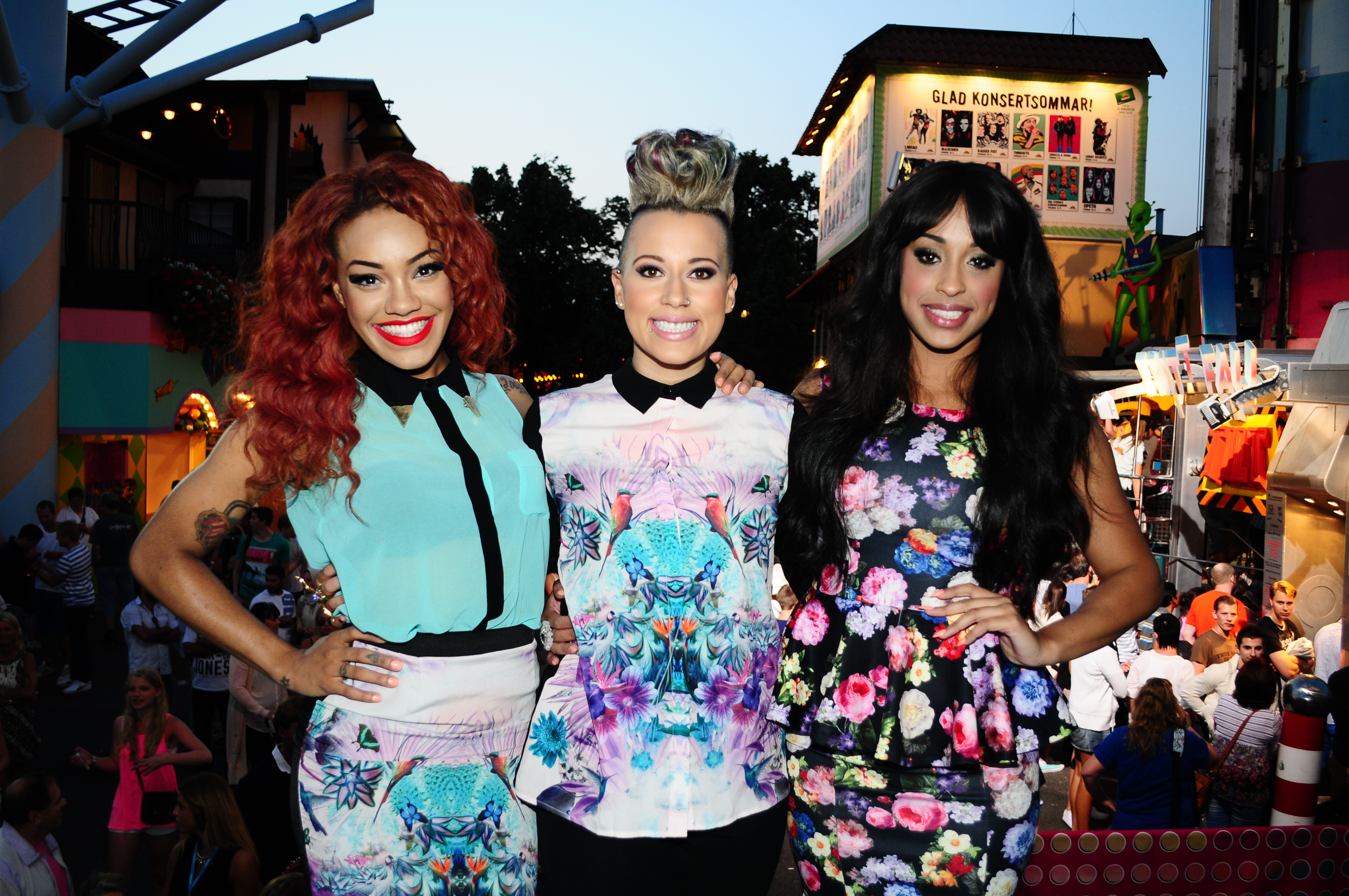
- Stooshe in 2012. From left to right: Karis Anderson, Courtney Rumbold, and Alexandra Buggs

Background information
- Origin: London, England
- Genres: R&B; soul; hip hop
- Years active: 2010–present
- Labels: Warner; Trilogy Records
- Members: Karis Anderson; Alexandra Buggs; Courtney Rumbold

Stooshe (/ˈstʊʃi/ STUU-shee) are an English girl group from London, consisting of three members Alexandra Buggs, Karis Anderson and Courtney Rumbold. Initially signed to Warner Music, they released of their first single "Love Me", featuring American rapper Travie McCoy, in 2012. Later that year Stooshe were nominated for the BBC's Sound of 2012 poll.

Their debut single, "Love Me", featuring American rapper Travie McCoy, peaked at number five on the UK Singles Chart. They released "Black Heart" in June 2012, which peaked at number three after a month in the top 10. A cover of TLC's "Waterfalls" was released as a single in November 2012. "Slip" was released as the third single and reached number 12 on the UK Singles Chart. Their debut album, London with the Lights On, was released on 27 May 2013.

The first single from their second album, "Lock Down", was released on 15 January 2016. Stooshe announced "Let It Go" as the second official single, and it was released 1 July 2016.

== History ==
=== 2010: Formation ===
Stooshe was formed in May 2010 by creative director Jo Perry, and signed to Warner Music in August 2011. The original concept was to create an urban and soulful Spice Girls. Alexandra Buggs, Karis Anderson and Courtney Rumbold formed following a series of auditions and scouting in Topshop stores over a nine-month period. Rumbold was scouted first, then Buggs, by a stylist in store. Anderson, a former Brit School alumna, joined last after her MySpace demos caught the attention of management. The band members admitted that the group was "manufactured" but that their chemistry "did seem natural".

Using tracks from writing/production duo Future Cut, the group spent the next twelve months developing their look and sound. Anderson said the band's name originates from the word 'stoosh', which is urban slang for something expensive, "a girl who thinks she's nicer than she is", or being stoned. They then added 'she' on the end to represent female empowerment. The resulting name is pronounced like the Scottish word "stooshie".

=== 2011–2013: London with the Lights On ===
The group released their first song, "Fuck Me", on YouTube on 14 March 2011, originally featuring rapper Suave Debonair. This was subsequently re-recorded under the title Love Me with Travie McCoy. The group also recorded a music video for "Hot Stepper", a cover of the 1994 track "Here Comes the Hotstepper" by Ini Kamoze at Hyde Park's Wireless Festival in July 2011.

The second single, "Betty Woz Gone", was released onto iTunes on 28 October 2011, earning placement on BBC Radio 1's In New Music We Trust playlist. In March 2012 they re-released Fuck Me under the new title of Love Me., which served as the lead single from their first album, Stooshe. The track marked the group's first chart appearance, debuting at number five on the UK Singles Chart – having sold 37,789 copies, also peaking at number seven on the Scottish Singles Chart for the week ending 17 March 2012.

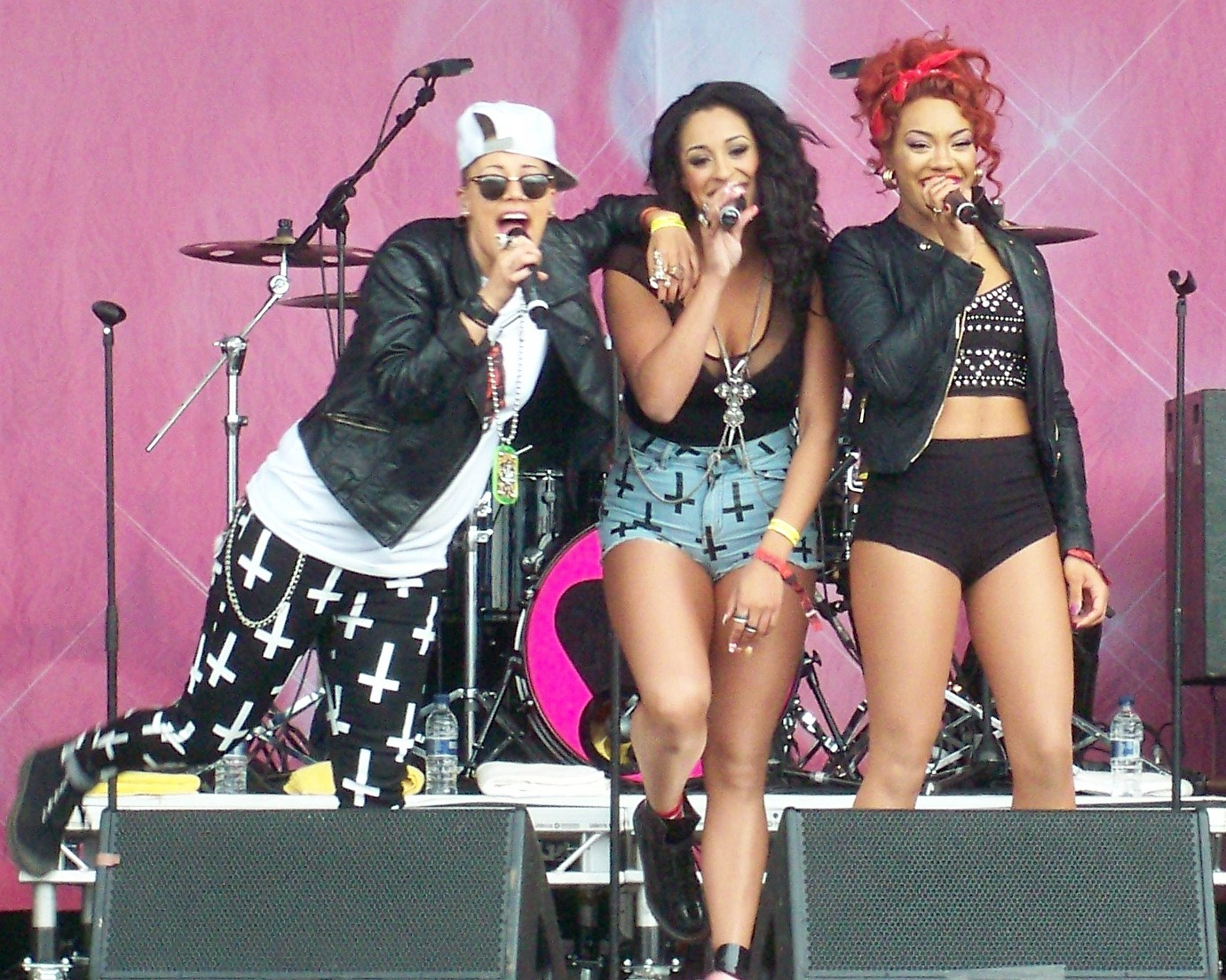
Stooshe performing at GuilFest in July 2012.

Stooshe released their second single, "Black Heart", on 15 June 2012, which peaked at number three on the UK chart. It was announced in June 2012 that the group would be supporting American rapper Nicki Minaj on the UK leg of the Pink Friday Tour. Stooshe performed a brief set on the Bingley Music Live main stage on 31 August 2012. It was announced in October 2012 that the group would be supporting Jennifer Lopez on a part of the European leg of the Dance Again World Tour.

On 15 November, it was reported that the album's release would be delayed until March 2013 after their cover of TLC classic nineties track "Waterfalls" failed to chart in the Top 20. Stooshe's debut album was released on 27 May 2013, under the title London with the Lights On. They performed "Slip" on Britain's Got More Talent TV show on 1 June 2013. London with the Lights On entered the UK albums chart at Number 8. "My Man Music" was announced as the fourth single from the album.

In July 2013, they performed at the Alton Towers Live concert.

=== 2014–present: Unreleased second album and inactivity ===
In autumn 2013, the group split from their record label due to disagreements over London with the Lights On. They were to work (as of February 2014) independently on a second album, which has yet to be released. They said that they would eventually sign to a new label. They are now under Trilogy Records.

Stooshe announced "Lock Down" as the lead single from their upcoming untitled second album; the single was released on 15 January 2016. The video to "Lock Down" was shot in L.A., and at HM Kingston Prison, Portsmouth, England. The new single has two official remixes. Stooshe announced "Let It Go", released 1 July 2016, as the second single from the album. Like "Lock Down", the music video for "Let It Go" was filmed by Damien Sandoval, and shot in Italy.

The group performed at Chesterfield Pride on 22 August 2021.

== Discography ==
- London with the Lights On (2013)

== Awards and nominations ==
Year	Organisation	Category	Nominee	Result	Ref
2011	BBC	Sound of 2012	Stooshe	Nominated	
2012	4Music Video Honours	Best Breakthrough	Stooshe	Nominated	
2012	4Music Video Honours	Best Group	Stooshe	Nominated	
2012	4Music Video Honours	Best Video of 2012	"Black Heart"	Nominated	
2012	4Music Video Honours	Best Video of 2012	"Love Me"	Nominated	
2012	MOBO Awards	Best Newcomer	Stooshe	Nominated	
2013	Brit Awards	Best British Single	"Black Heart"	Nominated	
2013	Arqiva Commercial Radio Awards	PPL Breakthrough UK Artist of the Year	Stooshe	Nominated	
2014	2014 World Music Awards	World Music Award for World's Best Album	London with the Lights On	Nominated	

== Tours ==
- The Papercut Chronicles II Tour (supporting Gym Class Heroes) (January 2012)
- Pink Friday Tour (supporting Nicki Minaj) (June 2012)
- Dance Again World Tour (supporting Jennifer Lopez) (October 2012)
- Stooshe Live Tour (UK Headline Tour) (12–18 December 2012)
