= Let's Go =

Let's Go may refer to:

== Film ==
- Let's Go (1918 film), a 1918 comedy short starring Harold Lloyd
- Let's Go (1923 film), a silent film written by Keene Thompson
- Let's Go! (film), a 2011 Hong Kong action film

== Music ==
=== Albums ===
- Let's Go (David Campbell album), 2011
- Let's Go! (album), an album by Nathan Williams, 2000
- Let's Go (Nitty Gritty Dirt Band album), 1983
- Let's Go (Rancid album), 1994
- Let's Go! (EP), an EP by the Apples in Stereo, 2001
- Let's Go, by Rocky Sharpe and the Replays, 1981
- Let's Go!, by The Ventures, 1963

=== Songs ===
- "Let's Go" (Calvin Harris song), 2012
- "Let's Go" (The Cars song), 1979
- "Let's Go" (Key Glock song), 2023
- "Let's Go" (King Stingray song), 2022
- "Let's Go" (Nocera song), 1987
- "Let's Go" (Pharoahe Monch song), 2007
- "Let's Go" (Shawn Desman song), 2005
- "Let's Go" (Travis Barker song), 2011
- "Let's Go" (Trick Daddy song), 2004
- "Let's Go!" (Wang Chung song), 1987
- "Let's Go" (will.i.am song), 2013
- "F.N.F. (Let's Go)", 2022 song by Hitkidd and GloRilla
- "Let's Go", by the Adicts from Sound of Music, 1982
- "Let's Go", by Beenie Man
- "Let's Go", by Cartel
- "Let's Go", by Def Leppard from Def Leppard
- "Let's Go", by Group 1 Crew from Outta Space Love
- "Let's Go", by Jay Chou from Jay Chou's Bedtime Stories
- "Let's Go", by Kool Moe Dee from The Greatest Hits
- "Let's Go", by Korn from The Path of Totality
- "Let's Go", by LiveonRelease from Goes on a Field Trip
- "Let's Go", by Mark Schultz from Mark Schultz
- "Let's Go", by Ministry from The Last Sucker
- "Let's Go", by Namie Amuro from Uncontrolled
- "Let's Go", by Ramones from End of the Century
- "Let's Go", by Royce da 5'9" featuring Twista from Rock City
- "Let's Go", by Samy Deluxe
- "Let's Go", by Stuck in the Sound from Pursuit
- "Let's Go", by Zion I from Break a Dawn
- "Let's Go", by the Feelies from The Good Earth
- "Let's Go!", by Eurythmics from Revenge
- "Let's Go!", by Girl's Day
- "Let's Go!", a Mickey's Fun Songs theme song from Disney Sing Along Songs
- "Let's Go (Nothing for Me)", by New Order from the soundtrack of the 1987 film Salvation!
- "Let's Go (Pony)", by The Routers, also covered by The Ventures
- "Let's Go (The Royal We)", by Run the Jewels from the Venom film soundtrack, 2018
- "(Let's Go), Get Lost", by Patrick Wolf from The Magic Position
- "V Put" (English: "Let's Go"), popular Soviet marching song
- "Let's Go, Go-Go White Sox", the fight song of the Chicago White Sox professional baseball team
- "Let's Go, Let's Go, Let's Go", a 1960 song by Hank Ballard and the Midnighters

== Publications ==
- Let's Go (book series), a series of travel guides
- Let's Go (textbooks), a series of children's textbooks by Oxford University Press
- Let's Go (So We Can Get Back), a 2018 memoir by Jeff Tweedy

== Television ==
- Let's Go (1964 TV series), a Canadian entertainment series
- Let's Go (1976 TV series), a 1970s-1980s Canadian children's series
- Let's Go! (Philippine TV series), a teen sitcom
- Bakusō Kyōdai Let's & Go!!, a 1998 manga and anime series

== Transportation ==
- Let's Go, a brand of Travel Express, a bus operator in the United Kingdom

== See also ==
- Let Go (disambiguation)
- "Let's-A Go!", an episode of Super Café
- Pokémon: Let's Go, Pikachu! and Pokémon: Let's Go, Eevee!, two Pokémon role-playing video games
- "Let's Go", the motto of the U.S. 325th Airborne Infantry Regiment
