= Black Heart (Stooshe song) =

Single by Stooshe

from the album London with the Lights On
- B-side: "Things That Make You Go Mmm"
- Released: 15 June 2012
- Recorded: 2011
- Genre: R&B
- Length: 3:27
- Label: Warner Music UK
- Songwriters: Jo Perry; Shaznay Lewis; Iyiola Babalola; Darren Lewis
- Producer: Future Cut

Stooshe singles chronology
"Love Me" (2012)	"Black Heart" (2012)	"Waterfalls" (2012)

Music video
- "Black Heart" on YouTube

"Black Heart" is a song by British girl group Stooshe, taken from their debut album London with the Lights On (2013). Produced and written by Future Cut in collaboration with Jo Perry and Shaznay Lewis, it was released as the album's second official single by Warner Music UK from 15 June 2012. "Black Heart" is a ballad with a "Motown-esque" feel about it. Group member Courtney Rumbold revealed the song showcases Stooshe's different range, tones and styles. The lyrics to "Black Heart" talk of the issues of being in a relationship with a cheating lover. The cover art for "Black Heart" was released on 17 May. It depicts the girls in illustrated outfits and Jenny Mensah of 4Music called it "loud, bright and colourful".

Critical reception of the song was generally positive. Rhik Samadder from The Guardian called "Black Heart" an "homage to 60s girl group melodrama", while 4Music's Nicolle Weeks branded it "a classic tune to swoon to". The accompanying music video was directed by Matt Stawski and released on 29 April. It was shot in Los Angeles using vintage cameras and the setting uses a mixture of themes similar to those featured in the musicals Dreamgirls and Hairspray. The video depicts Stooshe as a girl group from the Sixties on the set of a television show. It shows band member Alexandra Buggs in a relationship with the host of the television show and him cheating on her with an assistant.

== Background ==
In April 2012, it was announced "Black Heart" would serve as the second official single from Stooshe's debut album. Produced and written by Future Cut in collaboration with Jo Perry and Shaznay Lewis, "Black Heart" was released in the United Kingdom by Warner Music UK on 17 June 2012. Group member Karis Anderson commented that working with Lewis on the song was "amazing" as she is from a successful girl group (All Saints) herself. Anderson revealed "Black Heart" is a ballad and the opposite of what the band had released so far. She explained "I think we made our mind up that with every single we're gonna reinvent ourselves. This one is a bit Motown-esque." Alexandra Buggs stated that the track was her favourite from the album and that after being boxed into an "explicit upbeat category", the group decided to slow things down. Courtney Rumbold told Digital Spy's Robert Copsey and Jamie Wotton that all three members of Stooshe sing on the track and listeners would be able to hear their different ranges, tones and styles.

"Black Heart" deals with the issues of being in a relationship with a cheating lover. Buggs thought "Black Heart" was a song that girls can relate to, while guys would also like it. The cover art for the single was released on 17 May. It depicts the girls in illustrated outfits. Jenny Mensah of 4Music called the cover "loud, bright and colourful" and said "there's no way you'll be able to miss it on the record shop shelves."

== Critical reception ==
Rhik Samadder from The Guardian wrote that the song is an "open homage to 60s girl group melodrama"; which could possibly fit to the soundtrack of a Disney film about the serial killer Ted Bundy. He added that they just sound like the Spice Girls covering The Supremes. Weeks branded the song a "stylised ballad" and "a classic tune to swoon to"; which also highlight's Stooshe's "stripped-down natural talent". Becca Longmire from Entertainmentwise.com commented that "Black Heart" will allow the group "to reinvent themselves, adding a little Motown with that signature Stooshe style."

A soLondon writer stated "There's passion, pain and great singing here - this is surely going to be a bigger hit than their first single, and a great curtain-raiser for the new album, out later in the year." Issy Sampson, writing for NME, said "The girlband's second single features 98 per cent less Laahndann accents and 100 per cent less Travie McCoy than their debut, and for that they must be applauded. The first step is recognising you have a problem, the second step is making a retro song that's more slutty Supremes than 'Wannabe' Spice Girls. Congratulations Stooshe." Digital Spy's Robert Copsey gave "Black Heart" four out of five stars and commented that when it comes to the matters of the heart, Stooshe were "just as sensitive as the rest of us." He added that the finale of the song is "attitude-packed". He had previously included it in the website's "10 tracks you need to hear" playlist and compared it to "The Promise", a song performed by Girls Aloud.

Idolator's reporter wrote that the song is more of a "mournful take on love gone awry than the kind of frisky jam the ladies are known for". While a writer from Shout Mag described the single as "another corker". But a writer from Popjustice branded the song as being "boring". A singles reviewer from the Huddersfield Daily Examiner wrote "Stripped right back to the bones with the Motown hallmark stamped all over it from the all-girl trio. Sure to open up a whole new generation's ears and, hopefully, minds to the vintage glory days." "Black Heart" later appeared on the A-lists at BBC Radio 1, BBC Radio 1Xtra, BBC Radio 2 and Heart. In August 2012, Stooshe were given a Nielsen Airplay Award, after "Black Heart" surpassed 30,000 plays on UK radio. In December, Robert Copsey and Lewis Corner from Digital Spy named "Black Heart" the second best song of 2012. "Black Heart" earned a nomination for Best British Single from the 2013 BRIT Awards.

== Chart performance ==
On the Irish Singles Chart, "Black Heart" debuted at number 19 for the week ending 22 June 2012. It rose to number 18 a week later, before rising a further four places to 15 during its third week on the chart. The single later rose to a peak of seven. "Black Heart" debuted at number four on the UK Singles Chart for the week ending 30 June 2012, after selling 53,065 copies. A week later, it dropped to number eight, but then climbed three places to five. Alan Jones of Music Week stated that sales of the single had increased 17.75% week-on-week to 46,431. "Black Heart" later climbed two places to three for the week ending 4 August 2012. "Black Heart" also debuted at number four on the Scottish Singles Chart, before dropping two places. The song has sold 456,000 copies in the UK in 2012, the 27th best-selling single of the year. As of November 2016, it has sold 521,000, making it the 10th best-selling song in the UK by a girl group.

== Music video ==
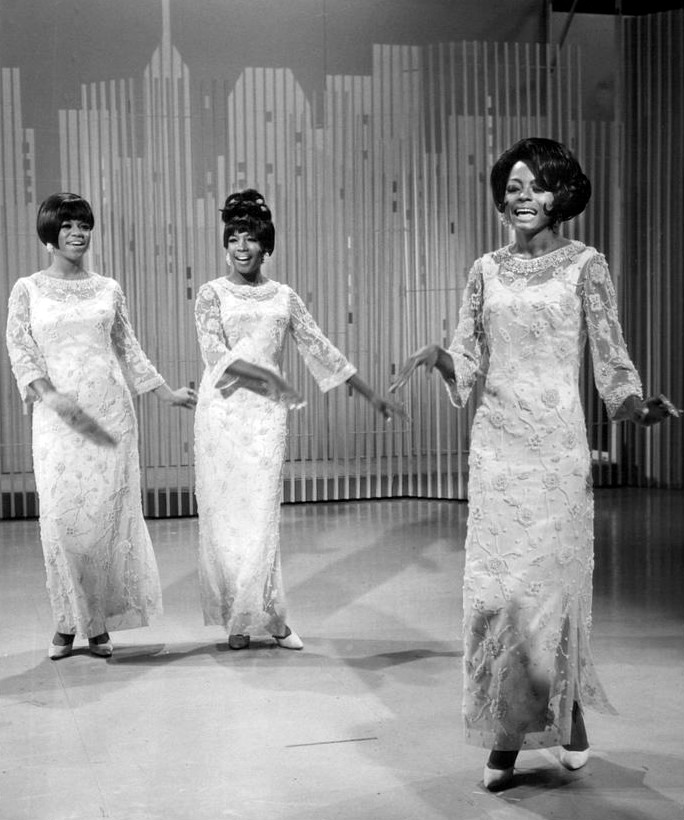
The music video for "Black Heart" pays homage to 1960s R&B acts such as The Supremes

=== Background ===
The accompanying music video, directed by Matt Stawski, was released on 29 April 2012. Prior to the full release, Stooshe debuted an unconventional "preview video" of the visual. Stooshe shot the video for "Black Heart" in Los Angeles using cameras "from back in the day." Each day of filming was done in twenty-hour shifts and the group drank "energy shots" to help them focus, but Anderson told Copsey and Wotton from Digital Spy that she and the other band members "were all looking at each and cracking up" by the end of the shoot. The group told Ponciano Junior from MOBO that the video to "Black Heart" is "completely different" to the one accompanying their previous single "Love Me".

The setting has a mixture of themes which are similar to those featured in the musicals Dreamgirls, Hairspray, and by girl group The Supremes. The trio sport big hair styles and the same long dresses which are individually coloured. They stand on podiums singing into "old school" microphones. Stooshe also revealed that the visual required "a lot of acting" on their part. A writer for soLondon commented that the video also features large cameras and old fashioned hair-dryers. They added "the video reeks of nostalgia for a time when The Supremes ruled the roost."

=== Synopsis ===
In the video for "Black Heart", the group perform their song on a staged area for a television recording, before they paint the hearts hanging on the set black. The performance is intercut with a storyline where member Buggs has a love interest in the presenter. She then realises, after many signs, that he is cheating on her with a production assistant. The music video ends with an outfit change, reminiscent of funeral clothes, alongside the now-painted black hearts, and Anderson and Rumbold consoling Buggs.

The soLondon writer said the relationship story made "Black Heart" "not just another vacuous pop video, but something well-crafted and memorable, with great attention to detail."

=== Reception ===
Shortly after the video was released, it trended on social networking site Twitter. A writer from Idolator said that the video was more "somber" than the "Love Me" video and was "appropriate" for the song. They opined that it was "gorgeously shot in vibrant colours" and a homage to "The Supremes". They concluded that "unlike the no-good man the song’s about, this classy vid's definitely a keeper." 4Music's Nicolle Weeks stated that Stooshe are familiar with "colourful videos rife with hotties". She added that in the "Black Heart" video, "their usual tongue-in-cheek naughtiness takes a back seat to some impressive vocal abilities."

== Live performances ==
Stooshe performed "Black Heart" in a cappella for 4Music on 19 April 2012. On 24 May, Stooshe performed the song for the Real Radio group, as part of an exclusive vocal session. Stooshe performed "Black Heart" at the Hackney Academy for BBC Radio 1's Live Lounge on 11 June. Three days later, the trio performed an exclusive acoustic of the song for entertainment website Digital Spy. It was recorded at the Red Bull Studios in London. They later performed the track in front of forty fans during a secret gig, exclusive to MUZU TV. They also began touring "Black Heart" on the music festival circuit, starting with Nando's Gignics and later at the Lovebox Festival.

== Track listing and formats ==
- Digital download
1. "Black Heart" - 3:27
- CD single
1. "Black Heart" - 3:27
2. "Black Heart" (Show N Prove Remix Feat. Smiler) - 3:32
3. "Black Heart" (Bimbo Jones Radio Edit) - 3:25
4. "Black Heart" (Wookie Radio Edit) - 3:11
5. "Things That Make You Go Mmm" - 3:27
- Exclusive single remix (Note: This song was initially made available via exclusive digital download on Stooshe's official website.)
1. "Black Heart" (Exclusive DEVOlution Club Mix) – 5:05
- Black Heart (Remixes) - EP
1. "Black Heart" - 3:27
2. "Black Heart" (Show N Prove Remix Feat. Smiler) - 3:32
3. "Black Heart" (Bimbo Jones Radio Edit) - 3:25
4. "Black Heart" (Wookie Radio Edit) - 3:11
5. "Things That Make You Go Mmm" - 3:27
- Exclusive 'Black Heart' Single Bundle (Note: This package consisting of all three versions of the release was initially made available via exclusive purchase on Stooshe's official website.)
1. CD single
2. Black Heart (Remixes) - EP
3. Exclusive single remix

== Credits and personnel ==
Credits adapted from "Black Heart" CD single liner notes.

- Stooshe - vocals
- Jo Perry – writer, vocal producer
- Iyiola Babalola – writer
- Darren Lewis – writer
- Shaznay Lewis – writer
- Future Cut – producer
- Manny Maroquin – mixer

== Charts and certifications ==
=== Weekly charts ===
Chart (2012)	Peak position
Belgium (Ultratip Bubbling Under Flanders)	28
Euro Digital Songs (Billboard)	9
Finnish Download Chart (Suomen virallinen lista)	25
Hungary (Rádiós Top 40)	9
Iceland (Lagalistinn)	26
Ireland (IRMA)	4
Scotland Singles (OCC)	4
South Korea (Gaon)	123
UK Singles (OCC)	3

=== Year-end charts ===
Chart (2012)	Position
Hungary (Rádiós Top 40)	79
UK Singles (OCC)	27

=== Certifications ===
Region	Certification	Certified units/sales
United Kingdom (BPI)	Platinum	600,000^{‡}
^{‡} Sales+streaming figures based on certification alone.

== Release history ==
Country	Release date	Format
Ireland	15 June 2012	Digital download, digital EP
Belgium	15 June 2012	Digital download, digital EP
United Kingdom	17 June 2012	Digital download, digital EP
United Kingdom	18 June 2012	CD single
