= Let It All Go =

Let It All Go may refer to:

- "Let It All Go" (Rhodes and Birdy song), 2015
- "Let It All Go", a 2011 song by Saves the Day from the album Daybreak
