= My Man Music =

Single by Stooshe

from the album London with the Lights On
- Released: 28 July 2013
- Recorded: 2010
- Genre: R&B; reggae
- Length: 3:32
- Label: Warner Music UK
- Songwriters: Jo Perry; Alexandra Buggs; Courtney Rumbold; Diana Barrand; Iyiola Babalola; Darren Lewis
- Producer: Future Cut

Stooshe singles chronology
"Slip" (2013)	"My Man Music" (2013)	"Lock Down" (2016)

"My Man Music" is a song by British girl-group Stooshe from their debut album London with the Lights On. Produced by Future Cut, it was released as the album's fourth single by Warner Music UK from 28 July 2013. "My Man Music" is a reggae themed song about being in love with music so much, it is like an alternative to having a partner. It is also about appreciating different types of music. The song was recorded in 2010 and has its own dance routine It was described by group member Alexandra Buggs as having a "summer feel". The accompanying music video was directed by Courtney Phillips and released on 20 June 2013. It depicts the group singing the track at a roof party.

== Background ==
On 4 June 2013, Digital Spy's Sam Rigby reported that Stooshe would be releasing "My Man Music" as the fourth single from their debut album London with the Lights On. A press release via Warner Music UK detailed how "My Man Music" carries on Stooshe's "trademark soulful vocal delivery" accompanied by a charismatic attitude. It was billed as a summer song with reggae themes complete with its own dance routine. "My Man Music" was recorded in 2010 and group member Karis Anderson said it was a song Stooshe had from the beginning.

The track was written by Stooshe with Jo Perry and Iyiola Babalola and Darren Lewis, who also produced it under their stage name Future Cut. Anderson told Lewis Corner from Digital Spy that the song had not changed much and that it was one of the only songs that Stooshe did not "re-vocal" for the album, even though they wanted to. Anderson also commented "Obviously it's a song off the album so everybody can already get it, but we wanted to put a video to it."

Alexandra Buggs told Carl Smith from Sugar that "My Man Music" is about being in love with music so much, that it is like the alternative to having a partner. Buggs thought the song had a "summer feel", which was perfect for the song's release date on 28 July 2013. Anderson also believed that it was right time to release the song, especially with the warm weather.

== Reception ==
A reporter from Shout said "My Man Music" has an easy dance routine because the lyrics instruct the listener. They described it as a "summery song stamped with the trademark Stooshe style – it's soulful, super catchy, and brimming with loads of the attitude." Sam Johnson from LGBT website So So Gay said that "My Man Music" was one of the standout tracks from "London with the Lights On". Martin Townsend from the Daily Express also labeled it as the standout because of its "sheer audacity alone". He believed it was like the rebirth of reggae duo Althea & Donna complete with "Spice Girl-style giggles".

Matthew Horton dubbed the song "cockney reggae" in a review released via Virgin Media. Andy Gill from The Independent criticised the song for being excessively sassy. He branded it the "muted dancehall number "My Man Music" with bogus interjections". Alexi Duggins from Time Out said that "'My Man Music' curiously apes Lily Allen's early reggae-lite shtick." Lauren Murphy from The Irish Times described it as "Caribbean pop". The Guardian's Luke Holland dubbed "My Man Music "a pleasingly scowl-free nugget of sunny fun". He added "Yeah, it's pap pop, but you can't hate it. Hating it would be like calling a puppy a prick."

== Music video ==
The accompanying music video, directed by Courtney Phillips, was released on 20 June 2013. On 3 June 2013, a statement released via Stooshe's Twitter account said that they would begin filming following week. The shoot took place on 7 June. The video was filmed on location at the Netil House Studios in East London. "My Man Music" marks Stooshe's first music video shot outdoors. 4Music released a series of behind the scenes photographs from the video shoot. The visual depicts the trio hosting a roof party in sunny weather. Visible in the background is the London skyline.

Louisa Walker from 4Music described the video as eclectic selection of people, bright colours and a "funky little dance move". She added that the video made her company eager to join the party. Carl Smith from Sugar said that Stooshe invented their own "ruddy dance routine" that followed a "new twerking phenomenon" used by other prominent acts in the music industry.

== Live performances ==
In July 2013, the group performed an exclusive live acoustic rendition of the song for The Huffington Post. They also performed a brief a cappella version of the track for Lucy Buckland of the Daily Mirror. Stooshe performed another acoustic version of "My Man Music" at the Red Bull Studios for entertainment website Digital Spy.

== Charts ==
Chart (2013)	Peak position
UK Singles (Official Charts Company)	140

== Release history ==
Country	Release date	Format
United Kingdom	28 July 2013	Digital download
