= Dissident Prophet =

English indie rock band

- Origin: Birmingham, England
- Genre: Indie rock
- Years active: 1994–1997, 2001–2006, 2012–2019
- Label: MGL Granite Records
- Past members: Andy Jennings; Tom Livemore; Simon Smith; John Large; Collin Burton; Dave Odart; Melanie J. Robbie Maxwell; Tom Rankin
- Website: dissidentprophet.bandcamp.com

Dissident Prophet were an apocalyptic indie rock band from Birmingham, England. Formed in 1994, the group was active during three periods: 1994–1997, 2001–2006 and 2012–2019. Between 2001 and 2006, the band performed and recorded under the name Maccabees, distinct from the Brighton indie rock band The Maccabees.

The band's music incorporated Christian and apocalyptic themes.

== History ==
=== 1994–1997 ===
Dissident Prophet formed in Birmingham in 1994. The original line-up consisted of vocalist Andy Jennings, guitarist Tom Livemore, bassist Simon Smith and drummer John Large.

The band became associated with MGL Granite Records, the rock imprint of Birmingham-based MGL.

The band's early singles included "Unconditional Love", "Generation X" and "Hang Him Round Your Neck". "Unconditional Love" and "Generation X" were reviewed by Cross Rhythms.

Their debut studio album, We're Not Grasshoppers, was released during the band's original period of activity.

The group ceased activity in 1997.

=== 2001–2006 ===
The band reformed in 2001, with Jennings and Livemore joined by bassist Collin Burton, drummer Dave Odart and keyboardist and vocalist Melanie J.

In October 2001, the band's song "Man From The Sky" was used in a short animation broadcast by Carlton Television.

During this period, the group adopted the name Maccabees. In a 2003 interview with Cross Rhythms, the musicians discussed the name change and the change in the band's lyrical focus.

The band's second studio album, 21st Century Spin, was released under the Maccabees name in 2003. Jennings, Melanie J. and Burton discussed the religious and social themes of the album in their 2003 Cross Rhythms interview.

Robbie Maxwell subsequently replaced Odart on drums. The band released Modern Man under the Maccabees name in 2005.

The group ceased activity again in 2006.

=== 2012–2019 ===
The group later returned under its original name, Dissident Prophet. The group released the album Weapons of Mass Deception in 2012.

The band released Red Moon Rising in 2015.

Strange Days followed in 2017. Cross Rhythms described Dissident Prophet at the time as a "veteran apocalyptic rock band from Birmingham".

In June 2019, Dissident Prophet released the five-track EP Just Five More Songs.

== Discography ==
=== Studio albums ===
We're Not Grasshoppers (1997) 21st Century Spin (as Maccabees, 2003) Modern Man (as Maccabees, 2005) Weapons of Mass Deception (2012) Red Moon Rising (2015) Strange Days (2017)

=== EPs ===
EP (Limited Edition) (1995) Striped & Pierced, Vol. 1: Selly Park Sessions (1997) Striped & Pierced, Vol. 2: Thought Ranch Sessions (1999) Striped & Pierced, Vol. 3 (2001) Striped & Pierced, Vol. 4 (2012) Just Five More Songs (2019)

=== Singles ===
"Unconditional Love" (1995) "Generation X" (1995) "Hang Him Round Your Neck" (1996)
