= Lock Down (song) =

Song by British girl-group Stooshe from their upcoming untitled sophomore album

Single by Stooshe
- Released: 15 January 2016
- Recorded: 2015
- Genre: R&B
- Length: 3:10
- Label: Trilogy Records
- Songwriters: Alexandra Buggs; Courtney Rumbold; Karis Anderson; Nait Masuku; Tekiva Ledwidge; Miss Vivianna
- Producer: Nathaniel "Detonate" Ledwidge

Stooshe singles chronology
"My Man Music" (2013)	"Lock Down" (2016)	"Let It Go" (2016)

Music video
- "Lock Down" on YouTube

"Lock Down" is a song by British girl-group Stooshe. It is a song with live instruments, strong beats and thick synths. The video was directed and produced by Damien Sandoval. It includes a cameo from America's Next Top Model and Guess model Dom Benjamin, it was filmed in Los Angeles and at HM Prison Kingston in Portsmouth. The track was released on 15 January 2016. It has two official remixes.

== Background ==
Following the release of their debut album, Stooshe took a break and parted ways with Warner, their record label. Group member Courtney Rumbold told a reporter for Closer that "Lock Down" was about the band having freedom, growing up and "breaking free". Karis Anderson commented, "'Lock Down' couldn't be any more personal to us, and although it's about us professionally, people can relate to it in so many different ways." They also said that the song "represents freedom and choice, a snapshot of the journey that we have been on so far, but it still stays true to us with our Motown theme running throughout". The track was written by Alexandra Buggs, Anderson, Rumbold, Nait Masuku, Tekiva Ledwige and Miss Vivianna from Funky Viva. The cover art for the single depicts Stooshe in front of a police line up wall wearing orange jumpsuits.

Stooshe endorsed two official remixes produced by White N3rd, which were also released on 15 January 2016.

== Music video ==
The music video was directed by Damien Sandoval. It features an appearance by model Dom Benjamin. The first half of the video was filmed in HM Prison Kingston in Portsmouth, while the second half was shot in Los Angeles. The video follows the girls through three different environments. After getting arrested, the girls are thrown in an all women's prison where the music starts, then a riot begins and they escape, thus entering the second environment, Los Angeles. The girls escape from the police, change clothes in a launderette but then are found and they are followed in pursuit, but they escape again in the back of a pick-up truck. And the last sequence is them dressed up in the desert singing and performing the songs choreography and they walk away as the camera shuts down. America's Next Top Model contestant Don Benjamin also makes a cameo in the video, playing a police officer.

== Live performances ==
The trio partnered with Sennheiser to promote the single and hold a concert at London's live music venue The Piano Works on 21 October 2015. Stooshe performed "Lock Down" on Celebrity Big Brother's Bit on the Side on 15 January 2016. That same day Stooshe also performed a live acoustic version of the song for PerezHilton.com.

== Critical response ==
Lewis Corner writing for Digital Spy said that "Lock Down" has a "a backdrop of bubbly brass and hip-pop beats." He branded the song a "solid return" for the band and added "characteristically full of energy and attitude, they've held on to the quirks that made them stand out first time around." Daniel Falconer from "Female First" said that the song was "showcasing the vocal talent that initially shot them to fame."

== Track listing ==
- Digital download
1. "Lock Down" – 3:10
- Digital EP
1. "Lock Down" (Dirty Dub House White N3rd Remix) – 4:32
2. "Lock Down" (Trapped Out White N3rd Remix) – 3:28

== Release history ==
Country	Release date	Format
United Kingdom	15 January 2016	Digital download
