= Slip (song) =

Single by Stooshe

from the album London with the Lights On
- Released: 12 May 2013
- Recorded: 2013
- Genre: R&B; soul
- Length: 3:45
- Label: Warner UK
- Songwriters: Jo Perry; Mo Brandis; Iyiola Babalola; Darren Lewis
- Producer: Future Cut

Stooshe singles chronology
| "Waterfalls" (2012) | "Slip" (2013) | "My Man Music" (2013) |

Music video
- "Slip" on YouTube

"Slip" is a song by British girl-group Stooshe from their debut album London with the Lights On. Produced by Future Cut, it was released as the album's third single by Warner Music UK from 12 May 2013. Stooshe released the official artwork for the single on 20 March 2013. "Slip" is about a partner who has become comfortable in a relationship and has forgotten how to be romantic.

The song has a Motown sound, which Karis Anderson said gave the group their sense of fun back. The accompanying music video was directed by Bryan Barber and released on 25 March 2013. It depicts the group singing the track in a bowling alley, while performing retro choreography.

== Background ==
"Slip" was written by Jo Perry, Mo Brandis, Iyiola Babalola and Darren Lewis. The song was produced by Future Cut, vocals were recorded and produced by Jo Perry and Mo Brandis. "Slip" was released by Warner Music UK on 12 May 2013.

Describing the track, Anderson explained "'Slip' is all about when your partner gets too comfortable – not our current partners – when they've got a bit too slap-dash in the relationship, taking you for granted, it's not cool."

Stooshe released the official artwork for the single on 20 March 2013. The group were depicted wearing varsity jackets in front of a brick wall.

== Reception ==
=== Critical response ===
The Huffington Post's Ashley Percival thought Stooshe were "making a bid to become our new favourite girl group" with "Slip". Robert Copsey from Digital Spy said that "Slip" is the type of song that radio stations play months after the release date. Copsey later gave the track four out of five stars and stated that "Slip" is "a worthy follow-up" to "Black Heart", adding "with their animated ad-libbing and energy-packed vocals, Stooshe prove they're not out for the count yet." Television host Lorraine Kelly branded the track as "edgy and excitable".

=== Commercial performance ===
"Slip" made its debut on the Irish Singles Chart at number 71. The song charted at number 12 on the UK Singles Chart.

== Music video ==
Stooshe announced via their Twitter account that the accompanying music video would premiere on 25 March 2013. The visual was directed by Bryan Barber. Karis Anderson has stated that the girl band were excited to collaborate with Barber because they admired his previous video work, which includes Christina Aguilera's "Ain't No Other Man" and Outkast's "Hey Ya!". The group later released a behind the scenes video of the video in the days following the premiere. The "50s varsity themed" video depicts the trio singing "Slip" in a bowling alley, while performing a choreographed dance routine. The girls are dressed in varsity jackets, personalised shirts and bowling shoes.

Jon Hornbuckle from LGBT website So So Gay said that the video was one of the "most infectiously fun music videos in ages". He opined that Stooshe are "too damn cool" and have their trademark personality in the video. Hornbuckle also warned that their dancing could start a new dance craze in bowling lanes. Lewis Corner from Digital Spy branded it an American-styled music video with retro choreography. He added that "the final result is a perfect game score of 300". Peter May from Gay Times said it was an "exciting video" with Stooshe "throwing some feisty and unforgettable shapes". He added that chose to match the theme of the video to their vintage sound.

== Live performances ==
Stooshe performed the song for the first time at a party hosted by Perez Hilton at the SXSW festival. The group later performed "Slip" live on The Voice of Ireland. Stooshe performed an acoustic version of "Slip" for The Daily Telegraph on 16 April 2013. On 6 May 2013, the trio performed the song on the daytime television show This Morning. On 16 May 2013, the group performed "Slip" on morning entertainment show "Lorraine". On 6 July 2013, they performed the song at theme park Alton Towers alongside their previous singles.

== Track listing ==
- Digital download
1. "Slip" – 3:45
- Digital EP
1. "Slip" – 3:45
2. "Slip" (Kat Krazy Remix Radio Edit) – 3:56
3. "Slip" (Eyes Remix) – 3:50
4. "Slip" (Pantha Remix) – 3:33
5. "Slip" (Kat Krazy Extended Remix) – 5:23

== Charts ==
| Chart (2013) | Peak position |
|---|---|
| Ireland (IRMA) | 58 |
| Scotland Singles (OCC) | 12 |
| UK Singles (OCC) | 12 |

== Release history ==
| Country | Release date | Format |
|---|---|---|
| Ireland | 12 April 2013 | Digital download |
| United Kingdom | 12 May 2013 | Digital download |
