= Letting Go =

Letting Go or The Letting Go may refer to:

== Music ==
=== Albums ===
- Letting Go (Nancy Nash album), 1982
- Letting Go (Earshot album), 2002
- Letting Go (Jennifer Knapp album), 2010
- Letting Go (EP), by Lo-Pro, 2009
- The Letting Go, by Bonnie 'Prince' Billy, 2006
- Letting Go, by Jennylyn Mercado, 2006

=== Songs ===
- "Letting Go" (Suzy Bogguss song)
- "Letting Go" (Wings song)
- "Letting Go (Cry Just a Little)", a song by Qwote
- "Letting Go (Dutty Love)", a song by Sean Kingston
- "Letting Go", by Angie McMahon from Light, Dark, Light Again
- "Letting Go", by Barbra Streisand from Guilty Pleasures
- "Letting Go", by Mayday Parade from Black Lines
- "Letting Go", by Seal from Seal 6: Commitment
- "Letting Go", by Jeremy Camp from Restored
- "Letting Go", by Kasabian from The Alchemist's Euphoria

== Other media ==
- Letting Go (novel), a 1962 novel by Philip Roth
- "Letting Go" (Body of Proof), a 2011 television episode
- "Letting Go" (Doctors), a 2000 television episode
- "Letting Go" (Due South), a 1995 television episode
- "Letting Go" (Holby City), a 2000 television episode
- "Letting Go" (Knots Landing), a 1982 television episode
- Letting Go, a 1985 TV movie starring John Ritter

== See also ==
- Let Go (disambiguation)
