= London with the Lights On =

Studio album by Stooshe
- Released: 27 May 2013
- Recorded: 2010–13
- Genre: R&B; hip hop; soul
- Label: Warner – UK
- Producer: Future Cut; Chris Braide; Scotty Granger; Mo Brandis

Singles from London with the Lights On
- 1. "Love Me" Released: 4 March 2012; 2. "Black Heart" Released: 15 June 2012; 3. "Slip" Released: 12 May 2013; 4. "My Man Music" Released: 28 July 2013

London with the Lights On is the debut studio album by English girl group Stooshe. It was originally set for release on 25 June 2012 under the name of Swings and Roundabouts, but was held back twice; under the new self-titled name and was name changed and released on 27 May 2013.

"Love Me" was released on 4 March 2012 as the album's lead single, peaking at number 5 on the UK Singles Chart. "Black Heart" was released as the second single on 15 June 2012 and became the group's highest-charting single to date, peaking at number 3. The third single from the album was initially intended to be "Waterfalls", a cover of the TLC song, which was released on 11 November 2012; however, Stooshe later revealed that it would not make the cut for the final track list and that they were disowning it. "Slip" was released as the album's third single on 12 May 2013, peaking at number 12.

== Background ==
Stooshe's début album was announced around the time of the release of the first single, "Love Me". It was initially titled Swings and Roundabouts and a release date was set for 25 June 2012. However, Stooshe later announced the album would be self-titled and would be released on 26 November 2012. On 15 November, Robert Copsey from Digital Spy reported that the album's release would be delayed until March 2013. A statement from the group explained "Following a late rush of creativity which has seen them write some of the best songs of their career, Stooshe have decided to delay the release of their début album until March 2013 so they have time to record these songs for inclusion on the album." Stooshe added that they would be going back to the studio soon to record the new songs.

Copsey later confirmed that the album would be released on 27 May 2013. The band revealed that they delayed the release of the album to undo their record label's interference. Anderson stated "It was down to us that our album didn't come out months ago," said Anderson. "It was ready to go, but we was listening to it and realised the label had changed a few mixes, a few structures and even taken off a few songs. We made this album before we got signed so it was important for us to still have control." The band also added that their third single, "Waterfalls", would not appear on the album and that they were disowning it. On 5 April, Sam Hine from Popjustice reported that Stooshe had renamed their album London with the Lights On.

== Reception ==
Professional ratings
Aggregate scores
Source	Rating
Metacritic	60/100
Review scores
Source	Rating
4music	3/5 stars
BG News	(B−)
Daily Express	5/5 stars
Digital Spy	4/5 stars
The Guardian	4/5 stars
The Independent	4/5 stars 1/5 stars
Irish Independent	2/5 stars
musicOMH	3/5 stars
No Ripcord	5/10 stars
Time Out London	3/5 stars

Caroline Sullivan from The Guardian gave London with the Lights On four out of five stars and commented "Listening to the album is akin to eavesdropping on a conversation between funny, trash-talking women who happen to sing like a trio of Beyoncés: it's a noisy, highly entertaining 50 minutes." Stephen Unwin, writing for the Daily Express, said "It feels like we've been waiting a long time for this first album and in no way does it disappoint. A little En Vogue here, a lot of Salt-n-Pepa there, it is a witty, confident, exceptional debut." The Independent's Simon Price also received the album well, saying "The south London trio's effortlessly assured debut combines classic 1960s soul, streetparty reggae, upfront electro-pop, cackling Night Bus backchat and shameless sexual innuendo. And there is nothing not to love about it." However, Price's colleague Andy Gill gave the album one star, explaining that London with the Lights On "is pretty thin fare" and that the majority of songs collapse "under the weight of excess sass."

== Singles ==
- "Love Me", featuring US rapper Travie McCoy, was released as the lead single from the album on 4 March 2012, peaking at number 5 on the UK Singles Chart. The accompanying music video was released on 16 January 2012.
- "Black Heart", the album's second single, was released on 17 June 2012. The song peaked at number 3, becoming Stooshe's highest-charting single to date.
- "Slip" was released as the third single on 12 May 2013. The song peaked at number 12 in the UK.
- "My Man Music" was released as the fourth single on 28 July 2013. The music video was filmed in the week beginning 10 June and released on 20 June.

== Track listing ==
Track listing confirmed by iTunes.

No.	Title	Writer(s)	Producer(s)	Length
1.	"Slip"	Jo Perry; Mo Brandis; Iyiola Babalola; Darren Lewis	Future Cut	3:45
2.	"Love Me" (featuring Travie McCoy)	Jo Perry; Courtney Rumbold; Travie McCoy; Babalola; D. Lewis	Future Cut	3:05
3.	"Black Heart"	Jo Perry; Shaznay Lewis; Babalola; D. Lewis	Future Cut	3:28
4.	"Jimmy"	Jo Perry; Lindy Robbins; Babalola; D. Lewis	Future Cut	3:42
5.	"My Man Music"	Perry; Buggs; Rumbold; Diana Barrand; Babalola; D. Lewis	Future Cut	3:32
6.	"Kiss Chase"	Perry; Ed Drewett; Babalola; D. Lewis	Future Cut	3:18
7.	"Round 2"	Perry; Mo Brandis; Babalola; D. Lewis	Future Cut	3:57
8.	"Hoochi Mumma"	Perry; Rumbold; Barrand; Babalola; D. Lewis	Future Cut	3:39
9.	"Your Own Kind of Beautiful"	Perry; Chris Braide; Robbins	Future Cut	3:37
10.	"Put the Kettle On"	Jo Perry; Mo Brandis; David Landers; Tom Maine; Harry Tarlton	Tom, Dick & Harry Productions; Future Cut	4:01
11.	"Perfectly Wrong"	Perry; Braide; Inara George	Future Cut	3:42
12.	"See Me Like This"	Perry; Anderson; Buggs; Rumbold; Babalola; D. Lewis; Jack McManus; Andrea Martin; Blair MacKichan	Future Cut	3:29
13.	"Fly Again"	Perry; Brandis; Gavin Holligan	Perry; Brandis; Holligan	4:14
14.	"Turning Me On"	Perry; Brandis; Thom Bell; Obi Ebele; Ben Ebele; Linda Epstein	Future Cut	3:18

Deluxe edition bonus tracks
No.	Title	Writer(s)	Producer(s)	Length
15.	"Ain't No Other Me"	Perry; Scotty Granger; Brian Judah; Leon Thomas; Roahn Hylton	Future Cut	3:03
16.	"Inbred City"	Perry; Babalola; D. Lewis	Future Cut	3:41
17.	"Shame"	Perry; Babalola; D. Lewis	Future Cut	3:03
18.	"Whatta Man"	Cheryl James; Hurby Azor; David Crawford	Azor	4:28
19.	"Here Comes the Hotstepper"	Chris Kenner; Dennis Lambert; Brian Potter; Salaam Remi; Ini Kamoze	Remi	3:37
20.	"Out-takes"	Future Cut	Future Cut	2:39

== Charts ==
Chart (2013)	Peak position
Irish Albums (IRMA)	30
Scottish Albums (OCC)	9
UK Albums (OCC)	8

== Release history ==
Region	Date	Format	Label
United Kingdom	27 May 2013	CD, digital download	Warner – UK
