= Betty Woz Gone =

2011 song by Stooshe

Promotional single by Stooshe
- Released: 28 October 2011
- Recorded: 2011
- Genre: Hip hop; R&B; funk
- Length: 3:10
- Label: Warner Music UK
- Songwriters: Iyiola Babalola; Darren Lewis; Jo Perry
- Producer: Future Cut

"Betty Woz Gone" is a song by English girl group Stooshe. It was written by Iyiola Babalola, Darren Lewis and Jo Perry, and produced by Babalola and Lewis under their stage name Future Cut. "Betty Woz Gone" was released as a promotional track on 28 October 2011 by Warner Music UK. The song is based on the true story of a mother who sold her body to help fund her addictions. Group member Courtney Rumbold explained that Stooshe wanted to highlight the serious issues of alcohol and other drug abuse, making it clear that what Betty does is not cool. While the real woman did not die, Stooshe wanted to take their story to the extreme.

The lyrics to "Betty Woz Gone" consist of "cheeky ad-libs" and "black humour", which are told over "seductive synths" and "piano-rolling grind funk". The group have added their adaptation of the theme tune to The Fresh Prince of Bel-Air towards the end. "Betty Woz Gone" received positive reviews from critics and it was added to BBC Radio 1's in New Music We Trust playlist. The accompanying lyric video, which was released on 29 September 2011, shows the lyrics in a bright graffiti style. On the day of its release, the video was watched 100,000 times, making it that day's most viewed music video in the UK and the 14th most viewed music video in the world.

== Background ==
In September 2011, it was announced by Mayer Nissim from Digital Spy that Stooshe would be releasing "Betty Woz Gone" as the follow-up single to "Fuck Me". The date of song's release was initially announced as being 28 November, but the single was released by Warner Music UK a month early. Group member Karis Anderson revealed that the song was based on a true story about a mother who was more interested in taking drugs and partying, than caring for her children. Anderson explained "It's about a really sad woman I knew growing up in Brixton who sold her body. Like in the song, she was messed up on drink. I don't think it's that extreme a topic to sing about. If you grow up in a big city now, you're bound to know someone like Betty."

Courtney Rumbold stated that while the group tell the story in the "Stooshe way", they also wanted to highlight the serious issues of alcohol and other drug abuse and make it clear that what Betty does is not cool. Anderson said that the real woman did not die, but the band wanted to take the story to the extreme. In an interview with Kim Dawson and James Cabooter of the Daily Star, Anderson added that Stooshe wrote about subjects that would help their fans identify with them. "Betty Woz Gone" was initially included on Stooshe's debut album, but after the album was held back, the track was left off the final release.

== Composition and lyrics ==
"Betty Woz Gone" was written by Jo Perry with Iyiola Babalola and Darren Lewis, who also produced the track under their stage name Future Cut. "Betty Woz Gone" is a mixture of "rhythm, heart-beat bass and seductive synths". According to a reporter for the Huddersfield Daily Examiner the track is "Boisterous piano-rolling grind funk". It has "bouncing melodies" and the track's lyrics are made up of "cheeky ad-libs", "black humour and sly venom". Towards the end of the song, the group have added their adaptation of the theme tune to The Fresh Prince of Bel-Air to fit in with the story.

== Critical reception ==
The song received positive attention from critics. Ffion Davies of Altsounds branded the song "the perfect introduction to Stooshe" and said it was "unapologetic, completely unlike anything you've heard before and bursting with personality." She also called it "a tremendous debut single", which shows off the band's playfulness and talent. Gavin Martin from the Daily Mirror gave the song three out of five stars and stated "The girl group who don't play by the rulebook move into the mainstream with a Little Britain-style scenario that depicts wanton behaviour from the underclass. It's bound to ruffle political feathers, especially in its unexpurgated version, but their sharp exchanges brim with spice and character."

Robert Copsey from Digital Spy included "Betty Woz Gone" on the site's "10 tracks you need to hear" playlist. Copsey commented "the foul-mouthed trio are back with a tribute to Betty, a 'skank from the block' who ultimately ends up being carted off their local estate in a body bag. Think the complete opposite to Ed Sheeran's 'The A Team' with a nod to The Fresh Prince of Bel-Air." John Hall from The Independent quipped that Stooshe employ "jokey raps and a genuinely soulful chorus" to tell the sweary, "Lily Allen-esque tale" of a working class single mother. Digital Spy's Lewis Corner reported that "Betty Woz Gone" had been added to BBC Radio 1's in New Music We Trust playlist after "unprecedented popularity". Alexandra Buggs commented on the positive response the song received, saying "It was amazing! 'Betty Woz Gone' is only a soft release and we didn't at all expect it to be picked up on like it has."

== Lyric video ==
An accompanying lyric video, directed by Tom Oswald and Jess Gorick, was released on 29 September 2011. The animated video spells out the lyrics to the song. Gorick explained that she was immediately aware that she needed help with the video, as she and the label wanted graffiti to be the "centre stage of the piece." Gorick asked Oswald to co-direct the video, as they had previously worked together before and he is a graffiti writer. She stated that they wanted to tell the story in "a bright poppy way." Gorick explained "The style of the video had to be vivid, happy graffiti/street graphics, a cute but streetkid-savvy cartoon. A mixture of type animated in time with bespoke illustrations, highlighting ideas within the track. The typography has a different personality corresponding to each girl of Stooshe, with a different individual hero text rendered in a 90's graffiti black book style."

Within a day of its release, the video was watched over 100,000 times on YouTube, making it that day's most viewed music video in the UK and the 14th most viewed music video in the world. The video was also retweeted by fellow singers Ed Sheeran, Rizzle Kicks and Wretch 32. A Huddersfield Daily Examiner reporter commented that the video "went viral to the point of bubonic plague" upon its release. Lauren from Sugar believed the video had made her "feel a bit well'ard and edgy" and added "they swear a total of 13 times in it (yeah we're so cool we counted) and they talk about drugs and stuff, so if your sensitive soul gets a little upset by all that then you should probably skip it."

== Live performances ==
Stooshe performed "Betty Woz Gone" in a live session for MTV's The Wrap Up. The group later performed the single on T4. Stooshe performed "Betty Woz Gone" as part of their appearance at the Livesmusic SU tour Wrap Party at the King's College London Students' Union.

== Track listing and formats ==
- CD single
1. "Betty Woz Gone" (Radio Edit) – 3:22
2. "Betty Woz Gone" (Instrumental) – 3:34
3. "Betty Woz Gone" (Original Version) – 3:35
4. "Betty Woz Gone" (Blame Remix) – 3:25
5. "Betty Woz Gone" (Zed Bias Old Skool Vocal Mix) – 5:49
- Betty Woz Gone (Remixes) – EP
1. "Betty Woz Gone" – 3:10
2. "Betty Woz Gone" (Radio Edit) – 3:09
3. "Betty Woz Gone" (Blame Remix) – 3:22
4. "Betty Woz Gone" (Zed Bias Remix Old School) – 5:47
5. "Betty Woz Gone" (Heist Remix) – 5:40

== Release history ==
Country	Release date	Format
France	28 October 2011	CD, digital EP
Ireland	28 October 2011	CD, digital EP
United Kingdom	28 October 2011	CD, digital EP
