= Love Me (Stooshe song) =

Single by Stooshe featuring Travie McCoy

from the album London with the Lights On
- Released: 4 March 2012
- Recorded: 2011
- Genre: R&B; hip hop
- Length: 3:04
- Label: Warner Music UK
- Songwriters: Courtney Rumbold; Alexandra Buggs; Darren Lewis; Blair Mackichan; Jo Perry; Iyiola Babalola; Travis McCoy
- Producer: Future Cut

Stooshe singles chronology
"Betty Woz Gone" (2011)	"Love Me" (2012)	"Black Heart" (2012)

Travie McCoy singles chronology
"Pretty Girls" (2011)	"Love Me" (2012)	"Rough Water" (2013)

"Love Me" is the debut single by British girl group Stooshe, featuring vocals from American rapper Travie McCoy. The song was released in the United Kingdom on 4 March 2012 as the lead single from the group's debut album, London with the Lights On (2013).

== Background ==
The original version of the track, "Fuck Me", was first released online in March 2011. The version featured English rapper Suave Debonair and was accompanied by the release of a music video. The track (and the accompanying video) were removed from websites, including YouTube, in August 2011 following Stooshe's signing to Warner Music UK.

Member Rumbold used the lyrics of the original version of the track to come out as lesbian to her friends and family, as well as to the public.

It was then announced in November 2011 that the group would re-record and release the track as "Love Me" in March 2012, this time featuring American rapper Travie McCoy. The re-recorded track, produced by Future Cut, was uploaded to the group's official site on 4 January 2012 – with confirmation of the track serving as the lead single for their debut album.

== Chart performance ==
For the week ending 17 March 2012, "Love Me" debuted at number five on the UK Singles Chart and number seven on the Scottish Singles Chart, marking a debut appearance for the group on both. The track spent five weeks in the UK Top 75 between March and April.

== Music video ==
The official music video to accompany the re-recorded version of "Love Me" featuring Travie McCoy was released online on 16 January 2012. Directed by Matt Stawski, the video sees the trio and McCoy partying in a fictional hotel. The majority of the video was filmed using a green screen.

== Track listing ==
Digital download
No.	Title	Length
1.	"Love Me (featuring Travie McCoy)"	3:04
2.	"Fuck Me (featuring Travie McCoy)"	3:04
3.	"Love Me (featuring Travie McCoy)" (MD Remix)	3:08
4.	"Love Me (featuring Travie McCoy)" (Kat Krazy Remix)	4:46
5.	"Love Me (featuring Travie McCoy)" (Lazy Jay's Rave-O-Lution Remix)	4:55

== Charts ==
Chart (2012)	Peak position
Belgium (Ultratip Bubbling Under Flanders)	83
Scottish Singles Sales (Official Charts)	7
UK Singles (Official Charts)	5

== Certifications ==
Certifications
Region	Certification	Certified units/sales
United Kingdom (BPI)	Silver	200,000^{‡}
^{‡} Sales+streaming figures based on certification alone.

== Release history ==
Country	Release date	Label	Format(s)
United Kingdom	4 March 2012	Warner Music UK	Digital download
