= Andrew Bowser =

American film director

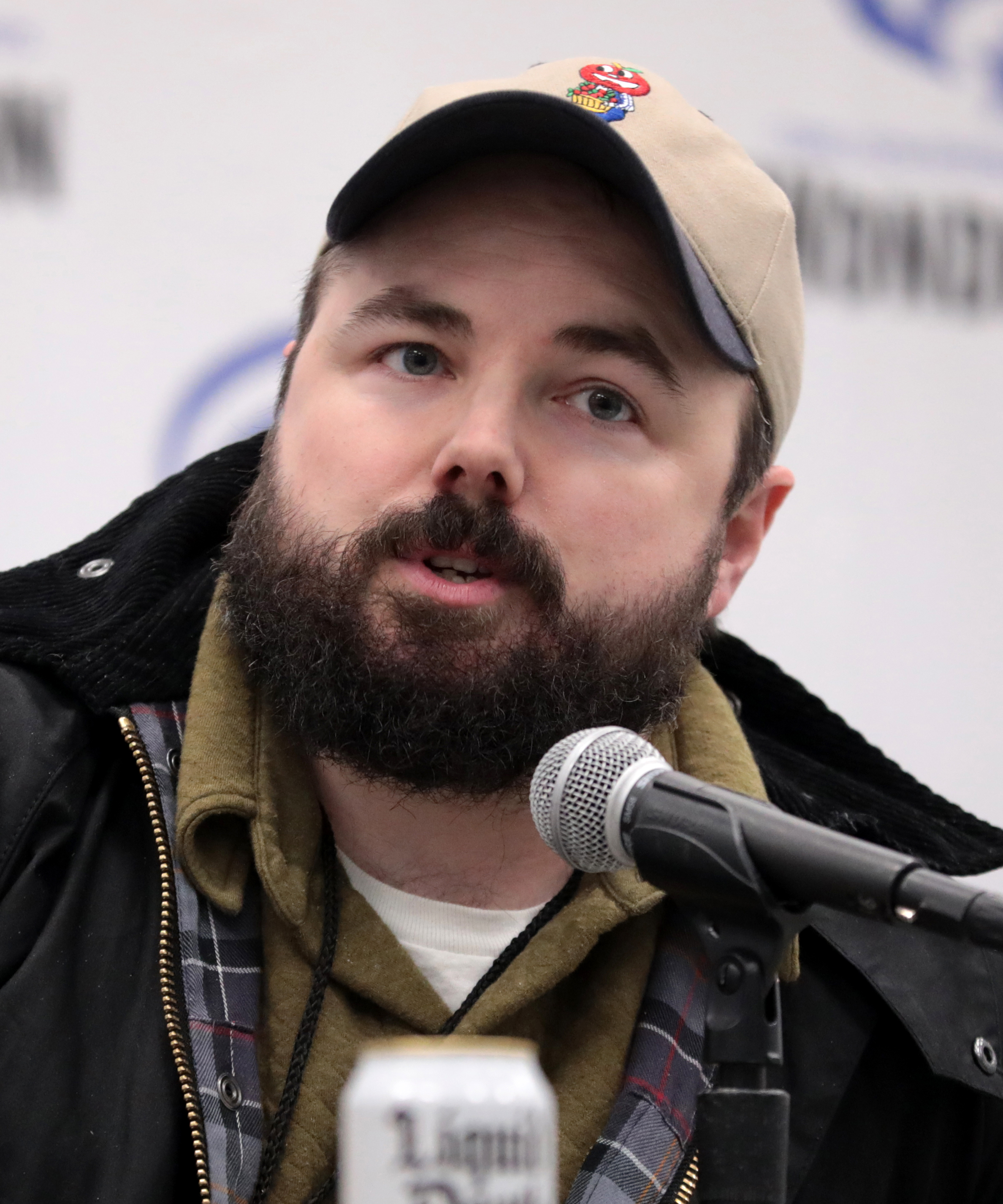
- Bowser at the 2023 WonderCon
- Other name: Andrew Paul Bowser
- Occupations: Film actor, film director, screenwriter, producer
- Years active: 2002–present

Andrew Bowser is an American filmmaker, actor, writer, and internet personality best known for his horror-comedy alter ego Onyx the Fortuitous. With a career spanning over two decades, Bowser has gained recognition for his genre-blending storytelling, viral internet videos, and independent filmmaking. He rose to prominence through festival-circuit films like Jimmy Tupper vs. The Goatman of Bowie , Worm, and his Sundance 2023 feature Onyx the Fortuitous and the Talisman of Souls, which he wrote, directed, and starred in.

== Early life ==
Andrew Paul Bowser was born on January 4, 1982, in Bowie, Maryland. He began acting at a young age, performing in theater, television, and film. As a child, he portrayed Colin in the international tour of The Secret Garden, played young Henry in Henry Hill, and guest-starred opposite Elijah Wood. in Homicide: Life on the Street.

He went on to study film at The School of Visual Arts in New York City, where he met frequent collaborator Joseph M. Petrick. In 2001 they created the short film Notes From The Rogues Gallery, laying the groundwork for a feature-length version. He attended SVA for two years before deciding to pursue professional directing.

== Career ==
Early directing and music video work (2002–2007)

In 2002, Bowser and frequent collaborator Joseph M. Petrick co-directed the music video for Ozma’s "Eponine", which was selected via an online contest by Kung-Fu Records. After leaving the School of Visual Arts during his second year, Bowser began working professionally in the music video industry. His first professional commission was for Butch Walker’s "Mixtape", which he secured by sending a fan letter and demo reel. This led to further work directing music videos for artists including Armor for Sleep, The Honorary Title, SR-71, Speech, Gym Class Heroes, and his own band Zella Mayzell. The band released an EP titled The Murder, Porn and Fatherhood and was later voted one of the Top 10 Unsigned Bands in the U.S. by Alternative Press.

In 2004, Petrick joined Bowser in Maryland, and the two began working more extensively together. Between 2004 and 2006, they co-directed the short film A Winter Observed (written by Petrick), which premiered at the Annapolis Film Festival, and the music video "New Friend Request" for Gym Class Heroes. Bowser also directed videos for The Hush Sound, Copeland, and Forgive Durden.

In early 2006, Bowser and Petrick produced a 50-minute version of Notes From the Rogues Gallery, using approximately $20,000 borrowed on credit cards after being unable to secure full funding. The short version premiered The Landlocked Film Festival in Petrick's hometown. That same year, Zella Mayzell went on hiatus, and the duo relocated to Los Angeles, where Bowser continued directing music videos for bands such as The Color Fred, Maylene and the Sons of Disaster, The Audition, Amber Pacific, The Hush Sound, Copeland, and Forgive Durden.

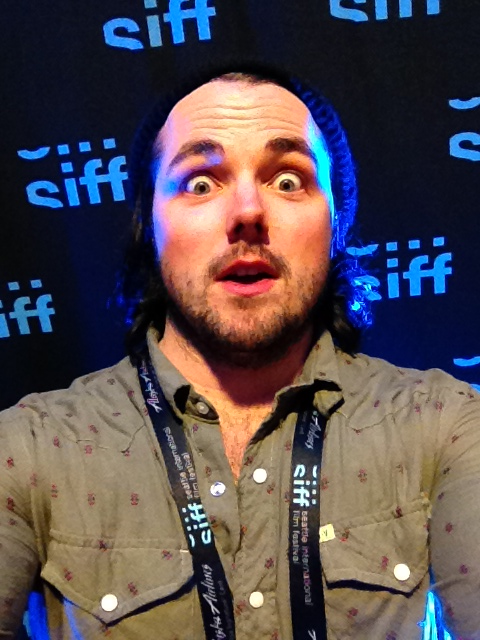
Bowser at the 2013 Seattle International Film Festival

In 2008, Petrick wrote the screenplay for the feature film The Mother of Invention which Bowser starred in and co-directed with Petrick. The mockumentary followed aspiring inventor Vincent Dooly as he attempts to win a coveted young inventors award. The film starred Bowser, Jimmi Simpson, Kevin Corrigan, Mark Boone Junior, Dee Wallace, Craig Anton, Ruby Wendell, F. Jason Whitaker, and Chris Hardwick. It features cameos by Dave Allen, Chris Franjola, Keir O'Donnell, Martha Madison and Ron Lynch. The film screened at The Hollywood Film Festival and The Sci-Fi-London Film Festival. Later that year, Bowser directed music videos for The Grey Man and Not So Tough Found Out for the Copeland album You Are My Sunshine which was released as a bonus feature on the deluxe version of the record.

In 2009, MTV hired Bowser and Petrick to create a pilot for a half-hour sketch comedy show. They created The Underground which stars Bowser as a man who lived in the basement of the network and hacked into their broadcast feed to air sketches and interstitials that featured him and his puppet cohorts. It was not picked up by the network but contained sketches that were featured on CollegeHumor and won FunnyOrDie's and HBO's Let's Go Viral contest, which led to creating the exclusive sketch Cycop for FunnyOrDie which premiered on July 12, 2010 and featured the protagonist from The Mother of Invention in a poorly made film of his creation. The sketch stars Bowser, Juno Temple, Ryan Cartwright, and Zelda Williams and announced the DVD release of the film.

In 2010, Bowser directed his first solo feature film Jimmy Tupper Vs. The Goatman of Bowie. The film is a "found footage" style horror film that followed a young man's perceived encounter with the titular cryptid and his ensuing quest to track and capture the beast. Based around the urban legend from Bowser's home town, the film premiered at the 2010 South By Southwest film festival.

His film Worm is the first feature to be shot solely using a GoPro camera. Worm premiered at SIFF 2013 and won the special jury prize at DeadCENTER 2013.

As of 2014, Bowser cohosts the Nerdist Industries podcast Bizarre States alongside Nerdist News's host Jessica Chobot.

In 2021, Bowser raised $610,467 to make the feature film Onyx the Fortuitous and the Talisman of Souls, which premiered at the 2023 Sundance Film Festival.

In 2025, Bowsers short comedy horror movie Frankenbabes from Beyond the Grave! premiered at the Screamfest. In the same year he got his feature horror movie The Decedent with help from Kickstarter-funds finished and released on Tubi.

== Filmography ==
Film
Year	Title	Role(s)	Genre
2007	Notes from the Rogues Gallery	Director, Actor	Comedy
2009	The Mother of Invention	Director, Actor	Comedy
2010	Jimmy Tupper VS The Goatman of Bowie	Director, Writer, Actor	Horror
2013	Worm	Director, Writer, Actor	Drama
2023	Onyx the Fortuitous and the Talisman of Souls	Director, Writer, Actor	Comedy, Horror
2025	The Decedent	Director, Writer, Actor	Horror
2025	Frankenbabes from Beyond the Grave!	Director, Writer	Comedy, Horror
