= Nathan Matthew David =

Filipino-American film and television composer

- Born: Nathan Matthew David; United States
- Education: University of Southern California
- Genres: Film and television scores, electronic, experimental
- Occupations: Composer, musician
- Instruments: Piano, keyboards, synthesizer, guitar
- Years active: 2006–present
- Website: nathanmatthewdavid.com

Nathan Matthew David is a Filipino and American film and television composer and musician. He is known for his scoring work on independent films and documentary features, and has served as composer for the television comedy series Angie Tribeca (2016–2018), the first season of the Lifetime documentary series Surviving R. Kelly (2019), the comedy film Joy Ride (2023), and on the DreamWorks animated film Forgotten Island (2026).

== Early life and education ==
Nathan Matthew David was born in the United States to Filipino immigrants, one from Manila and one from Pampanga; neither of them were musicians.

After writing some scores for student films and playing in bands, he studied music formally, graduating from the Scoring for Motion Pictures and Television program at University of Southern California. He studied a lot of western music, before turning to traditional Filipino music, including instruments such as the kulintang to the kutyapi, and has regarded himself as "an eternal student to these practices".

== Career ==
After graduating, David was brought on as composer for the 2008 independent Singaporean drama film The Olive Depression, directed by Joshua Lim. The film was noted for its sparse use of music, which Lim noted was a choice he and David agreed on during post-production. Among his other early solo work as composer was for the 2013 film Welcome Nowhere, directed by Kate Ryan and narrated by Ethan Hawke, which tackled the lives of Roma people in Bulgaria.

David later began collaborating with his mentors Ludwig Göransson and Theodore Shapiro on various projects, including We're the Millers, Community, Spy, Office Christmas Party, A Simple Favor, Bombshell, Tenet, and The Mandalorian.

He then began working on solo composition, and composed the score for the first season of the Lifetime documentary Surviving R. Kelly in 2019. He composed music on the HBO documentary Under the Grapefruit Tree: The CC Sabathia Story.

David's other notable works include Satisfaction, Slice, Deadly Class, Young Rock (TV series, 2021-2023), Hypnotic (2021), Chang Can Dunk, Stephen Curry: Underrated, Joy Ride, Addicted to Fresno, The Last Word (2017), the 2022 Netflix comedy film Me Time, TV comedy drama series The Brothers Sun (2024), and Diarra from Detroit (2024). He also composed additional music for the 2015 Warner Bros. film The Intern.

He wrote the score for DreamWorks' 2026 animated film Forgotten Island. His score for this film combines elements from the 1980s and 1990s, especially Filipino and Filipino American music, and he wanted to incorporate a feeling of nostalgia. He included instruments from indigenous Filipino peoples, using traditional instruments such as chanters, the Las Piñas bamboo pipe organ, and a Filipino choir singing in Tagalog. "A Parallel World", co-written and produced by David and performed by Filipino girl group Bini, was released as a promotional lead single before the film's theatrical opening on September 26. The soundtrack also features other Filipino artists, including H.E.R., Sophia Laforteza, Lea Salonga, and SB19.

David has cited various influences for his music, including Alexandre Desplat, Dario Marianelli, Gustavo Santaolalla, Jon Brion, John Adams, Steve Reich, Explosions in the Sky, Imogen Heap and Sigur Rós among others.

== Recognition and awards ==
In 2020, David was the recipient of several awards for his work on Surviving R. Kelly: a Peabody Award, an ASCAP award, and the 2020 Dean and Mary Kay ASCAP Foundation award.

In 2021, he was nominated for a Sports Emmy Award for his work on Under the Grapefruit Tree: The CC Sabathia Story.

== Personal life ==
David is a U.S. citizen. He engages in activism and volunteering, and is interested in the intersection of music with architecture.

== Filmography ==
=== As composer ===
==== Film ====
Year	Title	Director(s)	Studio(s)	Notes
2006	Sweet Lullaby	JC Gallego		Short film
2006	Heartbreaker	Christian Carroll		Short film
2007	Roman Candles	Christian Carroll		Short film
2008	The Olive Depression	Joshua Lim	Malacca Pictures	
2008	The Lost Coast	Gabriel Fleming	Year Zero Pictures	
2009	Command or Truth	Darine Hotait	Cinephilia Productions	Short film
2009	The Philosopher Kings	Patrick Shen	Transcendental Media	Documentary film
2009	The Far Side of Laughter	Darine Hotait	Cinephilia Productions	Short film
2009	My Homework Ate My Dog	Crystal Page		Short film
2009	The Afterlight	Alexei Kaleina; Craig William Macneill	Wintersea Films	
2010	Children of God	Kareem Mortimer	Mercury Rising Films	
2010	Less	Gabriel Diamond	OutsideFilms	with Ivy Ross, Hands, Dylan Trees, Tommy Rickard
2011	4.2.3.	Ryan Colucci	Spoke Lane Entertainment; Filmworks/FX	Short film
2012	Tina for President	Carmen Emmi	USC School of Cinematic Arts	Short film
2012	Veer!	Patrick Barry	Blue Llama Studios	
2013	10 Rules for Sleeping Around	Leslie Greif	Screen Media Films	with Alan Ett
2013	Welcome Nowhere	Kate Ryan	One Small Instrument Pictures	Documentary film
2015	Don Quixote: The Ingenious Gentleman of La Mancha	various	Rabbit Bandini Productions; USC School of Cinematic Arts	with Jeremy Lamb
2015	The House on Pine Street	Aaron Keeling; Austin Keeling	E3W Productions	with Jeremy Lamb
2015	Addicted to Fresno	Jamie Babbit	Andrea Sperling Productions; Gamechanger Films; Gravitas Ventures	
2015	Drunk Wedding	Nick Weiss	Weston Pictures; Paramount Pictures	
2015	Jane Wants a Boyfriend	William Sullivan	Orion Pictures	First collaboration with William Sullivan
2016	Trust Fund	Sandra L. Martin	KC Film Office	
2017	The Last Word	Mark Pellington	Bleecker Street	
2017	Actors Anonymous	Juel Taylor and others	Rabbit Bandini Productions; USC School of Cinematic Arts; Front Row Filmed Entertainment	with Jongnic Bontemps
2017	Dismissed	Benjamin Arfmann	BoulderLight Pictures	
2018	The Game Changers	Louie Psihoyos	Oceanic Preservation Society; Refuel Productions; Diamond Docs; The Djinn Foundation	Documentary film
2018	Summer '03	Becca Gleason	Big Cat Productions; Blue Fox Entertainment	
2018	Slice	Austin Vesely	Frëhand; N2ition Cinema; A24	with Ludwig Göransson
2019	Hold On	Tarek Tohme	Flipped Out Entertainment; Joule Entertainment; Stone Canyon Pictures	with Jeremy Lamb
2020	Under the Grapefruit Tree: The CC Sabathia Story	Aaron Cohen	HBO Sports	Documentary film
2021	Accepted	Dan Chen	Jubilee Media; Greenwich Entertainment; Concordia Studio	Documentary film
2021	Beauty Queen	Myra Aquino		Short film
2021	American Insurrection	William Sullivan	Saban Films	Second collaboration with William Sullivan
2021	Hypnotic	Matt Angel; Suzanne Coote	The Long Game; Netflix	
2021	A Man Named Scott	Robert Alexander	Mad Solar; Film 45; Amazon Studios	Documentary film
2022	Defy	Jon Jon Augustavo	A Bunch of Savages	Short film with Christophe Beck, Matthew Wang, DeadMono
2023	Stephen Curry: Underrated	Peter Nicks	A24; Apple TV+	Documentary film
2023	Chang Can Dunk	Jingyi Shao	Hillman Grad Productions; Makeready; Walt Disney Pictures	
2023	Joy Ride	Adele Lim	Lionsgate Films	
2025	Take No Prisoners	Adam Ciralsky; Subrata De	P3 Media; Vanity Fair Studios	
2026	Forgotten Island	Joel Crawford; Januel Mercado	DreamWorks Animation; Universal Pictures	

==== Television ====
Year	Title	Director(s)	Production company	Notes
2014-2015	Satisfaction		USA Network	20 episodes, with Ludwig Göransson
2016-2018	Angie Tribeca		TBS	30 episodes, with Ludwig Göransson
2018-2019	Deadly Class	Lee Toland Krieger; Adam Kane; Alexis Ostrander; Paco Cabezas; Anthony Leonardi; Ami Canaan Mann; Wayne Yip	Syfy	10 episodes
2019	Surviving R. Kelly	Nigel Bellis; Astral Finnie	Lifetime	Documentary series
2021-2023	Young Rock		NBC	37 episodes
2024	The Brothers Sun	Kevin Tancharoen; Viet Nguyen	Brad Falchuk Teley-Vision; Netflix	8 episodes
2024	Diarra from Detroit	Chioke Nassor; Brennan Shroff; Sadé Clacken Joseph; America Young	BET+	8 episodes
2024-2025	Chef's Table	Brian McGinn	Boardwalk Pictures; Netflix	Documentary series; 2 episodes

=== Additional music ===
- The Intern (2015)
- Office Christmas Party (as assistant to Theodore Shapiro; 2016)
- The Mandalorian (2019–2023)
- Transformers: Rise of the Beasts (2023)
