= Nerdist =

Digital entertainment subsidiary division

Nerdist Industries, LLC
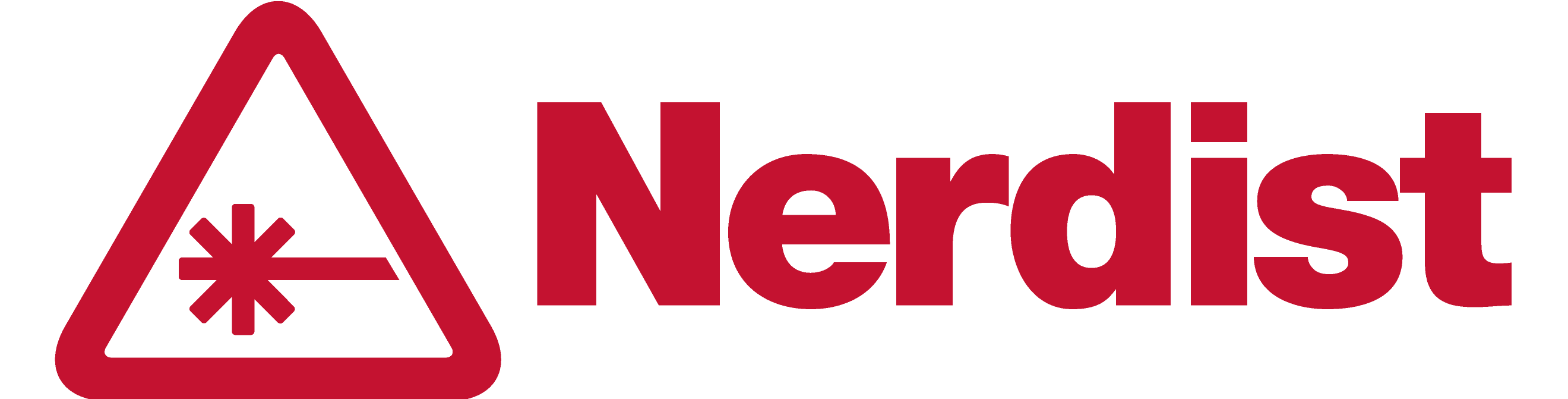
- Type: Subsidiary
- Industry: Digital entertainment
- Founded: February 2012; 14 years ago
- Founder: Chris Hardwick and Peter Levin
- Headquarters: Burbank, California, United States
- Parent: Legendary Digital Networks
- Website: nerdist.com

Nerdist Industries, LLC is part of the digital division of Legendary Entertainment. Nerdist Industries was founded as a sole podcast (The Nerdist Podcast) created by Chris Hardwick but later spread to include a network of podcasts, a premium content YouTube channel, a news division (Nerdist News), and a television version of the original podcast produced by and aired on BBC America.

== History ==
Nerdist Industries was formed in February 2012 after Hardwick and Peter Levin (GeekChicDaily) merged their separate entertainment projects into Nerdist Industries, after which GeekChicDaily was rebranded Nerdist News. The newly formed company began to produce additional podcasts under the Nerdist Industries banner as well as producing content and webshows for its Nerdist YouTube channel. In July 2012, Nerdist Industries was acquired by Legendary Entertainment. It was announced that Nerdist Industries would operate independently with Hardwick and Levin as its co-presidents.

Peter Levin left Nerdist Industries in 2013 and now heads Lionsgate's Interactive Ventures and Games. Hardwick then took over, and was chief executive officer until 2015, when he relinquished operational control until the expiration of his contract in 2017, with the original Nerdist podcast and archives remaining under Hardwick's control under the new title ID10T with Chris Hardwick. His presence with the company, including as founder, was clarified and removed from the website on June 15, 2018, after abuse allegations were made against him by a former girlfriend. On August 10, 2018, his name was then returned to Nerdist's website.

== Nerdist News ==
Nerdist News (founded February 2012; formerly GeekChicDaily) is the Nerdist branded pop culture newsletter, founded and originally operated by former Nerdist Industries CEO Peter Levin. The cross-platform publisher currently has two newsletter publications, Nerdist News and TOKYOPOP. GeekChicDaily became Nerdist News after it merged with Nerdist to form Nerdist Industries in February 2012. In late 2013 Nerdist News transitioned to a web series on YouTube channel "Nerdist", hosted by previous IGN Daily Fix presenter Jessica Chobot that airs five days a week to bring the latest news in nerdy pop culture.

== Nerdist Podcast ==
The Nerdist Podcast, the flagship podcast of Nerdist Industries, is a weekly interview show launched February 8, 2010, "about what it really means to be a nerd" hosted by Web Soup and Talking Dead host Chris Hardwick, who is usually accompanied by Jonah Ray and Matt Mira. The audio podcasts are typically an hour in length and include conversations with notable comedians or entertainers, sometimes at their own home. Guests are varied, though typically relate to either stand-up comedy, nerd culture, or both, and have included CM Punk, Rob Zombie, Stan Lee, Ozzy Osbourne, Jeri Ryan, Drew Carey and several cast and crew of Community, Doctor Who, and Star Trek: The Next Generation.

In late 2017, Hardwick's future with Nerdist Industries and parent company Legendary Entertainment became unclear. Although still technically CEO of Nerdist Industries, he considered his role to have become advisory, and no longer felt connected with the company. As his contract with Legendary approached its end with no discussion about renewing, Hardwick – who retains full rights to the podcast, including its catalog of back episodes – decided to move the podcast. Since he didn't have rights to use the Nerdist name on the podcast without heavy fees, and as part of a new venture, in February 2018 it was renamed to ID10T with Chris Hardwick.

== Nerdist podcast network ==
During 2011, Nerdist began releasing various other podcasts. As of June 2025 the full range includes:

- Laser Focus, In-depth discussions on movies, TV shows, and pop culture topics. Hosted by Kyle Anderson

=== Inactive/former podcasts ===
- The Alton Browncast, a food and food personality based podcast hosted by Food Network star Alton Brown
- Big Pop Fun, hosted by Tom Wilson
- Bizarre States, hosted by Jessica Chobot and Andrew Bowser
- Cashing In with T. J. Miller, hosted by Cash Levy with only guest T. J. Miller
- Cash Withdrawal, spinoff of Cashing In hosted by Cash Levy
- Chewin' It With Kevin and Steve, hosted by Kevin Heffernan and Steve Lemme
- Clonecast, a behind-the-scenes podcast of the television series Orphan Black
- Comic Book Club, hosted by Justin Tyler, Pete LePage, and Alex Zalben
- Competitive Erotic Fan Fiction, hosted by Bryan Cook
- Ding-Donger with Matt Braunger
- Dining with Doug & Karen, hosted by Karen Anderson and Doug Benson
- FEaB ("Four Eyes and Beard"), hosted by Matt Mira and Scott Mosier; a co-production with the SModcast Podcast Network
- Half Hour Happy Hour, hosted by Alison Haislip and Alex Albrecht
- Hound Tall Discussion Series, hosted by Moshe Kasher
- Humans From Earth, hosted by Geoff Boucher
- The Indoor Kids, a video game-centred podcast hosted by Kumail Nanjiani and Emily V. Gordon
- James Bonding, a James Bond podcast hosted by Matt Gourley and Matt Mira
- The Jonah Keri Podcast, sports based podcast hosted by Jonah Keri
- Jonah Raydio, a music-based podcast hosted by Jonah Ray (moved to the Maximum Fun network)
- The JV Club, hosted by Janet Varney
- The K-Ohle, a multi-format podcast hosted by Kurt Braunohler
- Kicking and Screaming, hosted by Jenna Elfman and Bodhi Elfman
- The Legacy Music Hour, hosted by Brent Weinbach and Rob F.
- Love, Alexi, hosted by Alexi Wasser
- Making It, hosted by Riki Lindhome
- Maltin on Movies, long form interview program, hosted by Leonard Maltin and Jessie Maltin
- Mike and Tom Eat Snacks, hosted by Michael Ian Black and Tom Cavanagh
- Mission Log: A Roddenberry Star Trek Podcast, in-depth discussions about every Star Trek episode and Movie hosted by John Champion and Ken Ray (active but no longer affiliated with Nerdist)
- The Mutant Season, hosted by 13-year-old Gil
- Nerdist Comics Panel, hosted by Len Wein, Ben Blacker, Heath Corson, and Adam Beechen (inactive since December 2017)
- The Nerdist Podcast, former flagship podcast which became the ID10T Podcast and moved to Cadence13
- Pop My Culture, hosted by Cole Stratton and Vanessa Ragland
- Pro You: Because You're Worth It, hosted by Tom J. Deters
- Puck Soup, hosted by Greg Wyshynski and Dave Lozo
- Sex Nerd Sandra, hosted by Sandra Daugherty
- Talkin' Toons with Rob Paulsen
- Terrified, hosted by Dave Ross
- Thrilling Adventure Hour, scripted show based on old timey radio shows (became active again in 2018 after a hiatus, is now hosted by the Forever Dog podcast network).
- Today We Learned, hosted by Dan Casey and Razzle Dangerously
- The Todd Glass Show, hosted by Todd Glass
- Watkins Family Hour, led by Sean Watkins and Sara Watkins at Largo
- We're Alive, A Story of Survival
- Will You Accept This Rose?, Bachelor themed podcast hosted by Arden Myrin, Erin Foley and Eddie Pepitone
- The Wrestling Compadres Slamcast
- The Writers Panel (formerly Nerdist Writers Panel), moderated by Ben Blacker (moved to the Forever Dog podcast network)
- You Made It Weird, hosted by Pete Holmes

== Nerdist Showroom ==
The Nerdist Showroom, also known as NerdMelt or the NerdMelt Showroom, was a performance space operated in collaboration with, and located inside, Meltdown Comics in Los Angeles, California. The showroom opened in April 2011 and ran through March 2018. It featured the Nerdist logo near the entrance, plush chairs, dark walls, and a far off green room. Performances included live stand-up comedy, storytelling shows, sketch comedy, movie screenings, writer's panels and podcast recordings. It was also the home of the Comedy Central television series The Meltdown with Jonah & Kumail. Past performers include Louis C.K., Jim Gaffigan, Dan Harmon, Kumail Nanjiani, Jonah Ray, and Robin Williams.

The Showroom closed with Meltdown on March 31, 2018, after the building's owners sold it to a developer planning to construct a new residential development along two blocks.

== YouTube channel ==
Content featured on Nerdist's YouTube channel. includes:

- 4 Points – interview show hosted by Alex Albrecht and Alison Haislip
- Ain't It Cool with Harry Knowles – a video version of Harry Knowles website Ain't It Cool News, a TV and film news, rumour and review site
- Awkward Family Photos
- Breaking Belding
- Chris Hardwick's All-Star Celebrity Bowling – a celebrity bowling competition where teams compete for the charities of their choice
- Comic Book Club – a video version of the podcast of the same name
- COPS: Skyrim – a voice-over Cops-style parody of the game Skyrim
- The Dan Cave – hosted by Dan Casey
- DIY Dammit
- Double Jump
- DVK: Daniel Van Kirk
- Dr. Tran – animated shorts featuring Dr. Tran
- Face To Face: With Weird Al Yankovic – a celebrity interview show with "Weird Al" Yankovic
- Fangoria's Blood and Guts – a show about monster makeup and gore effects hosted by Scott Ian
- Game Off
- Grammar Slam – presented by professional wrestler, CM Punk
- Hero Complex – interview show hosted by Geoff Boucher of Hero Complex magazine and website, featuring interviews with prominent film and TV personnel
- The Indoor Kids – a video version of the popular podcast, a video-game-based show hosted by Kumail Nanjiani and Emily Gordon
- Info Minute
- Just Cos – a series based around cosplay and conventions
- Justice League of America
- Justin Willman's Magic Meltdown – series featuring magician Justin Willman performing magic
- Math Bites
- Mothership – a weekly podcast hosted by Jessica Chobot & Hector Navarro (airs on Alpha but available on YouTube as well)
- Neil's Puppet Dreams – Neil Patrick Harris stars as himself and has dreams featuring puppets
- Nerd Down & 10 – the Sklar brothers break down nerd and pop culture topics as if they were sports
- Nerdist Comedy Shorts
- Nerdist News – a video version of the Nerdist News
- NerdTerns
- Nerdy Jobs with Matt Bennett
- Reasons to be scared of the Future
- Realm of LARP – a series about the world of live action role-playing
- Set List: Stand-Up Without A Net – stand-up comedy performances
- Sifl & Olly
- Simian Undercover Detective Squad (S.U.D.S.) – odd couple ape detectives Skreet and Yeager are forced to partner up and solve crime
- Skyrim at the Movies
- Star Talk – a video version of the StarTalk Radio podcast, a science-based show hosted by Dr. Neil DeGrasse Tyson
- Superego
- The Thrilling Adventure Hour – a video version of The Thrilling Adventure Hour podcast
- They Call Me Baba Booey – Gary Dell'Abate (aka Baba Booey), producer of the Howard Stern Show and tech and audio enthusiast, explores the latest products and pop culture
- Try This At Home! with Crabcat Industries
- Tournament of Nerds – a show featuring nerds debating each other about their favorite pop culture characters
- UCB Presents: Between the Scenes
- Weird Sh*t From Japan – Jukka Hilden explores aspects of Japanese culture under the watchful eye of Japanophile and comedian Chad Mullane
- What You Missed By Not Playing
- Write Now! With Jimmy Pardo – Pardo hosts this show where a team of writers write jokes on the fly about a guest stand-up comedian

== Other ==
- @midnight – Produced for Comedy Central
