= Kate Ryan (disambiguation) =

Kate Ryan (born 1980) is a Belgian singer-songwriter.

Kate Ryan may also refer to:

- Kate Moira Ryan, American playwright
- Kate Ryan (filmmaker), American filmmaker
- Kate Ryan (writer), Australian writer, winner of the 2015 Melbourne Writer's Prize and Residency
