= Joseph M. Petrick =

American writer and director (born 1982)

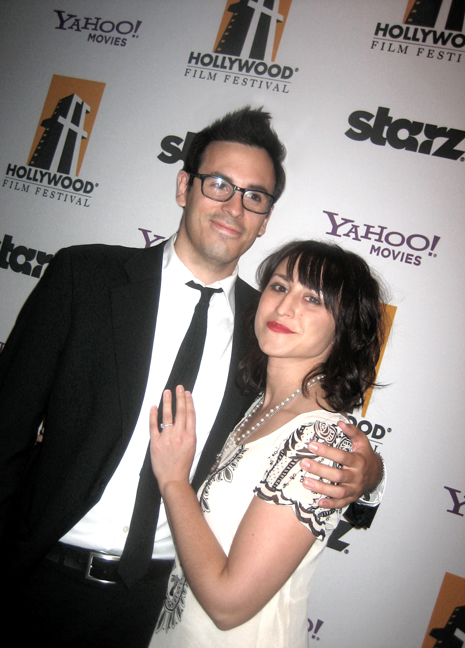
- Petrick with wife Kate Ryan at the 2009 Hollywood Film Awards
- Born: January 4, 1982 (age 44); Iowa City, Iowa, US
- Occupations: Film director, screenwriter, producer
- Years active: 2002–Present
- Spouse: Kate Ryan (2010–Present)
- Website: http://www.onesmallinstrument.com

Joseph M. Petrick (born January 4, 1982) is an American writer and director best known for his film collaborations with Andrew Bowser, including writing and co-directing the independent comedy The Mother of Invention.

== Early life and career ==
Joseph Morley Petrick was born in Iowa City, Iowa. While he, his mother and sister (actress Ruby Wendell) moved around frequently after the divorce of his parents, the majority of his adolescence was spent in the midwest. An aspiring filmmaker even in his youth, he wrote and directed short films throughout junior high and high school that he would screen on the local Public-access television cable TV channel.

While attending The School of Visual Arts, where he majored in film and screenwriting, he met Andrew Bowser and the two began collaborating on short films. In 2001, the two created a short film called Notes From The Rogues Gallery that would be the precursor to the film they would make in 2006. Petrick & Bowser also co-directed the music video of Eponine for the band Ozma in 2002 which was selected by Kung-Fu Records through a running online contest. After graduating from college in 2004, he and Bowser lived as roommates in an apartment in Maryland. Between 2004 and 2006, they co-directed the short film A Winter Observed (written by Petrick) which premiered at the Annapolis Film Festival, as well as the music video of New Friend Request for Gym Class Heroes.

In the spring of 2006, Petrick wrote the feature-length screenplay for the film Notes From the Rogues Gallery. Petrick & Bowser began searching for financing for the film but after having little luck, decided to make a truncated version of the film with 20,000 dollars they charged mostly on credit cards. The 50-minute version of the film screened at The Landlocked Film Festival in Petrick's home town. The following year, Petrick and Bowser moved to Los Angeles and co-directed the music video of Hate to See You Go for The Color Fred (with frequent DP David Kalani Larkins).

Filmmaker Wim Wenders picked a short film Petrick wrote and directed, Four Years, Six Months that starred Keir O'Donnell and Ruby Wendell as one of his favorite short films on the website Filmaka.com.

In 2008, Petrick wrote the screenplay for the feature film The Mother of Invention which Petrick would co-direct with Bowser. The "mockumentary" style film followed aspiring inventor Vincent Dooly as he attempts to win a coveted young inventors award. The film starred Bowser, Jimmi Simpson, Kevin Corrigan, Mark Boone Junior, Dee Wallace, Craig Anton, Ruby Wendell, F. Jason Whitaker and Chris Hardwick. It featured cameos by Dave Allen, Chris Franjola, Keir O'Donnell, Martha Madison and Ron Lynch. The film screened at The Hollywood Film Festival and The Sci-Fi-London Film Festival. Later that year, Petrick would direct the music video of To Be Happy Now for the Copeland album You Are My Sunshine which was released as a bonus feature on the deluxe version of the record.

In 2009, MTV hired Petrick & Bowser to create a pilot for a half-hour sketch comedy show. They created The Underground which starred Bowser as a man who lived in the basement of the network and hacked into their broadcast feed to air sketches and interstitials that featured him and his puppet co-horts. It was not picked up by the network but contained sketches that were featured on CollegeHumor and won FunnyOrDie & HBO's Let's Go Viral contest, which led to creating the exclusive sketch Cycop for FunnyOrDie which premiered on July 12, 2010, and featured the protagonist from The Mother of Invention in a poorly made film of his creation. The sketch starred Bowser, Juno Temple, Ryan Cartwright and Zelda Williams and announced the DVD release of the film. The same year Petrick also directed his first solo feature film, Ashes starring Tim Venable and Ruby Wendell as a brother and sister who must travel to Arizona to pick up the ashes of their estranged father. The film co-starred Craig Anton and Jim Turner.

Petrick directed the music videos for Down and Television by Jim Hanft who composed the original music for The Mother of Invention.

Petrick is also a musician and records under the banner of My Autumn Friend and Your Eyes Are Doves. Releasing independent records from his website.
