= Veer! =

- Directed by: P. Barry
- Written by: P. Barry; Jesse Gay
- Produced by: Kirsten Walsh; Antonio Sarte
- Starring: Jesse Gay; Corsica Wilson; Erin Nicole Cline; James Nguyen
- Cinematography: P. Barry
- Edited by: Antonio Sarte
- Music by: Nathan Matthew David
- Production company: Blue Llama Studios
- Distributed by: Indie Rights
- Release dates: November 2, 2012 (Jacksonville Film Festival); March 1, 2013 (Theatrical Release)
- Running time: 86 minutes
- Country: United States
- Language: English

Veer! is a 2012 American independent film directed by Patrick Barry, written by Barry and Jesse Gay, and starring Gay along with Corsica Wilson, Erin Nicole Cline, and James Nguyen. The film premiered at the Jacksonville Film Festival for its hometown screening, and went on to tour regional film festivals around the country, including the PollyGrind Film Festival, where it won the Skate or Die Award, and the Sunscreen Film Festival, where it won Best Florida Film. The film was released theatrically on March 1, 2013.

== Plot ==
The film focuses primarily on Jesse Sorensen, played by co-writer Jesse Gay, a washed-up professional skateboarding star now six years past his prime. After being dropped by his skate team and kicked off a friend's couch, Jesse moves in with his elderly grandmother only to discover his teenaged niece, Samantha (Corsica Wilson), crashing there as well. Having himself always led the wild lifestyle, Jesse becomes uncomfortable when Samantha opens up to him about dropping out of high school and partying. On a deeper level, Jesse confronts what he has spent his entire life avoiding - responsibility.

The film simultaneously follows the rapid rise of Strazz (James Nguyen), the young skate star who took Jesse's spot on the DieNasty Skate Team, chronicling the dangers of fast fame and money, and the subsequent fall-out between Jesse and Strazz.

== Cast ==
- Jesse Gay as Jesse Sorensen
- Corsica Wilson as Samantha Sorensen
- Erin Nicole Cline as Paige
- James Nguyen as Strazz
- Bryan Carson as Jesse's son

== Production ==
=== Short film ===
The feature-length film was based on a short film of the same name, which premiered at the 2009 Gen Art Film Festival for Emerging Talent. An experimental project that was shot on black and white 8mm film with no dialogue, the short film instead incorporated subtitles for the character's lines and interaction. It was only after the strong reaction the film received from the New York crowd that Barry and co-writer Gay decided to expand the idea into a feature-length film.

=== Filming ===
Barry and Gay began writing the feature together in 2009 and Barry quit his day job to begin pre-production shortly thereafter, but when he realized that he was only able to acquire half of the film's required budget through investors, Barry put the other half of the budget on his credit cards.

Filming took place in Jacksonville, FL over February and March 2010, including at the legendary Kona Skatepark.

The film was shot on multiple media, including the digital Canon EOS 7D, as well as motion picture film: on Super 8mm and Super 16mm film. Cody Mattox wrote at the time of the film's release, "When director Patrick Barry wanted to shoot his debut feature film, Veer!, on 16mm black & white film stock, production couldn’t afford that financial commitment; this limitation gave Barry the inspiration to break the film up into black & white film and color video portions. It is safe to say that this decision helps drive the narrative in an intriguing way, though I won’t spoil how..."

Of the production, Barry said, "It was a tough, in-the-trenches experience, and there were some very difficult moments where I wasn’t sure if the film was going to get finished, but the cast and crew really kept the train moving. I drew strength from them towards the end of the production."

=== Music ===
In an attempt to keep the film as local as possible, Barry and Gay only sourced local talent for music in the film. With the exception of composer Nathan Matthew David, of Los Angeles, all of the musical acts were based out of Jacksonville, Florida. The soundtrack included music by Crash the Satellites, After the Bomb Baby, Juicy Pony, Powerball, Christina Wagner, and Kevin Newberry.

=== Style ===
Barry played with many experimental techniques during shooting leading to what he felt was "disappointment" by audience members expecting a more traditional narrative structure.

== Awards ==
Veer! won the Skate or Die Award at the 2012 PollyGrind Film Festival and Best Florida Film at the 2013 Sunscreen Film Festival.
