= The Last Word (2017 film) =

- Theatrical release poster
- Directed by: Mark Pellington
- Written by: Stuart Ross Fink
- Produced by: Mark Pellington; Anne Marie MacKay; Kirk D'Amico; Aaron Magnani
- Starring: Shirley MacLaine; Amanda Seyfried; AnnJewel Lee Dixon; Anne Heche; Tom Everett Scott; Thomas Sadoski; Joel Murray; Adina Porter
- Cinematography: Eric Koretz
- Edited by: Julia Wong
- Music by: Nathan Matthew David
- Production companies: Wondros; Myriad Pictures; Aaron Magnani Productions
- Distributed by: Bleecker Street
- Release dates: January 24, 2017 (Sundance); March 3, 2017 (United States)
- Running time: 108 minutes
- Country: United States
- Language: English
- Box office: $2.9 million

The Last Word is a 2017 American comedy-drama film directed by Mark Pellington, from a screenplay by Stuart Ross Fink. It stars Amanda Seyfried and Shirley MacLaine.

The Last Word premiered at the 2017 Sundance Film Festival on January 24, 2017. It was released on March 3, 2017, by Bleecker Street.

== Plot ==
A retired businesswoman wants to control everything around her, knowing that she only has a little time left before an imminent death due to a medical condition. She decides to craft her own obituary, so she hires a young obituary writer to work with her to ensure her life story is told her way. The businesswoman tries to expand the horizons of her life, and adopts a young kid for mentoring and lands herself a job as a disc jockey. She grows close with the young writer and influences her life.

== Cast ==
- Shirley MacLaine as Harriett Lauler
- Amanda Seyfried as Anne Sherman
- AnnJewel Lee Dixon as Brenda
- Anne Heche as Elizabeth
- Tom Everett Scott as Ronald Odom
- Thomas Sadoski as Robin Sands
- Joel Murray as Joe Mueller
- Adina Porter as Bree Wilson
- Philip Baker Hall as Edward
- Sarah Baker as Zoe
- Steven Culp as Sam Serman
- Basil Hoffman as Christopher George
- Todd Louiso as Dr. Morgan

== Production ==
In September 2015, it was announced that Amanda Seyfried and Shirley MacLaine would star in the film, with Mark Pellington directing from a screenplay by Stuart Ross Fink, while Myriad Pictures would handle sales and finance the film. In February 2016, Anne Heche, Philip Baker Hall, and Tom Everett Scott joined the cast of the film. Nathan Matthew David composed the film's score.

=== Filming ===
Principal photography began on February 3, 2016 and concluded on March 11, 2016.

== Release ==
In November 2015, Bleecker Street acquired U.S distribution rights to the film. The film had its world premiere at the 2017 Sundance Film Festival on January 24, 2017. It was released on March 3, 2017. On its first weekend, the film grossed $35,000 from four theaters in New York and Los Angeles.

=== Critical reception ===
On Rotten Tomatoes, the film has an approval of 40% based on 92 reviews, with an average rating of 4.9/10. The website's critics consensus reads: "The Last Word proves Shirley MacLaine remains a wonderfully magnetic screen presence -- and deserving of a far better vehicle for her considerable talents." On Metacritic, the film has a score of 40 out of 100, based on 21 critics, indicating "mixed or average reviews".
