= Jessica Chobot =

American on-camera host and writer (born 1977)

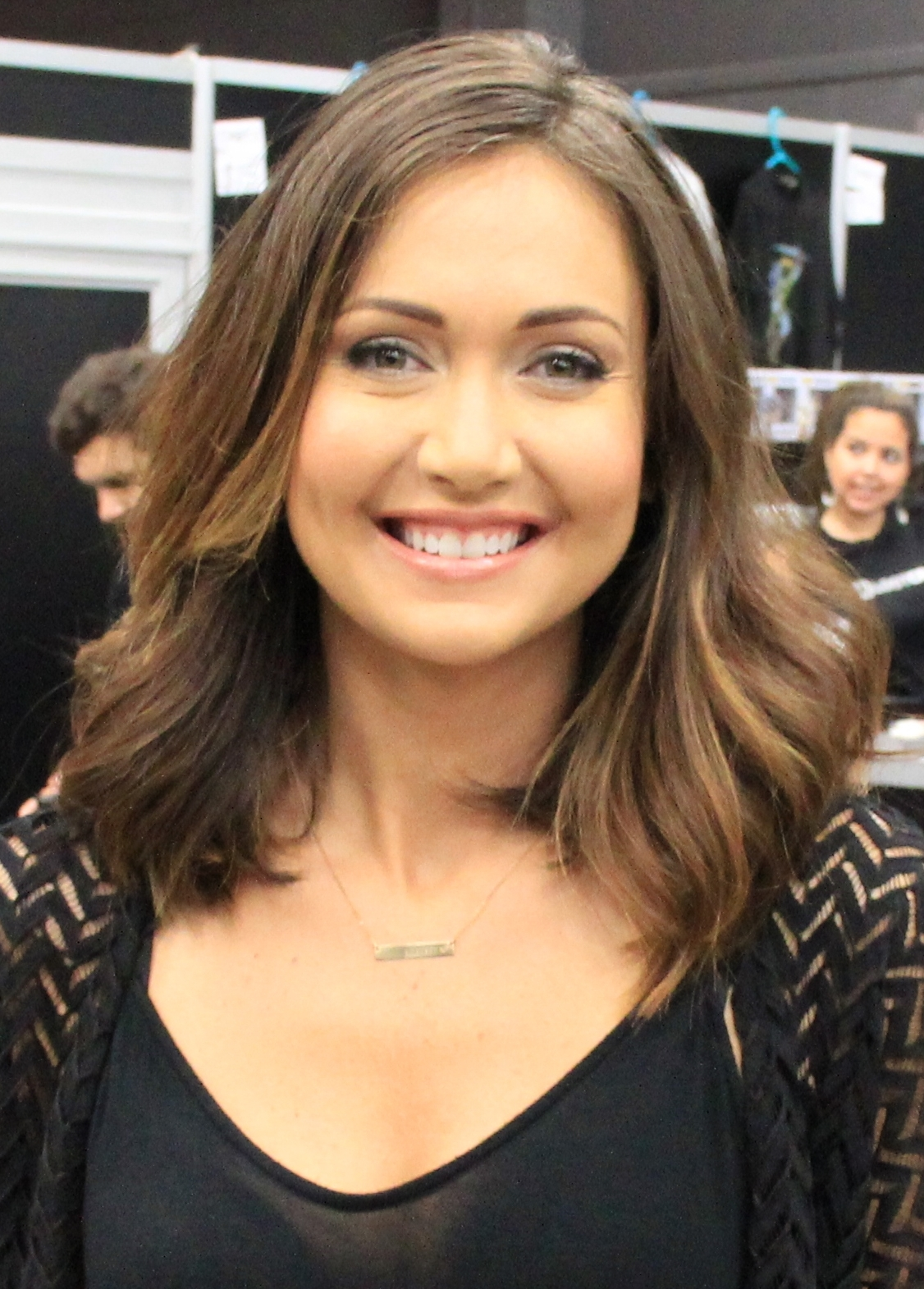
- Chobot in 2014
- Born: Jessica Lynn Horn; July 7, 1977 (age 49); Buffalo, New York, U.S.
- Occupations: Presenter, host, writer, podcaster
- Years active: 2005–present
- Spouses: Mr. Chobot (div. 2006) Blair Herter (m. 2012)
- Children: 1

Jessica Chobot (born Jessica Lynn Horn; July 7, 1977) is an American television host, writer, and podcaster. She is best known for hosting video game and pop culture programs, including IGN Strategize, IGN's Daily Fix! and G4's Attack of the Show. From 2013 to 2019 she served as the primary host of Nerdist News and its companion show Nerdist News Talks Back for Nerdist Industries. In 2014, she launched the paranormal podcast Bizarre States with co-host Andrew Bowser, produced under Nerdist Industries. Chobot later co-hosted the Discovery Channel reality TV series Expedition X., appearing in seasons one through seven. In 2025, in collaboration with law enforcement official Robert Collier, Chobot co-hosted the TV series Bigfoot Took Her.

== Early life ==
Jessica Lynn Horn was born in Buffalo, New York, and grew up in Novi, Michigan. Her family moved from town to town frequently during her youth. Before entering high school, she lived in several places on the East Coast and the Midwest.

== Career ==
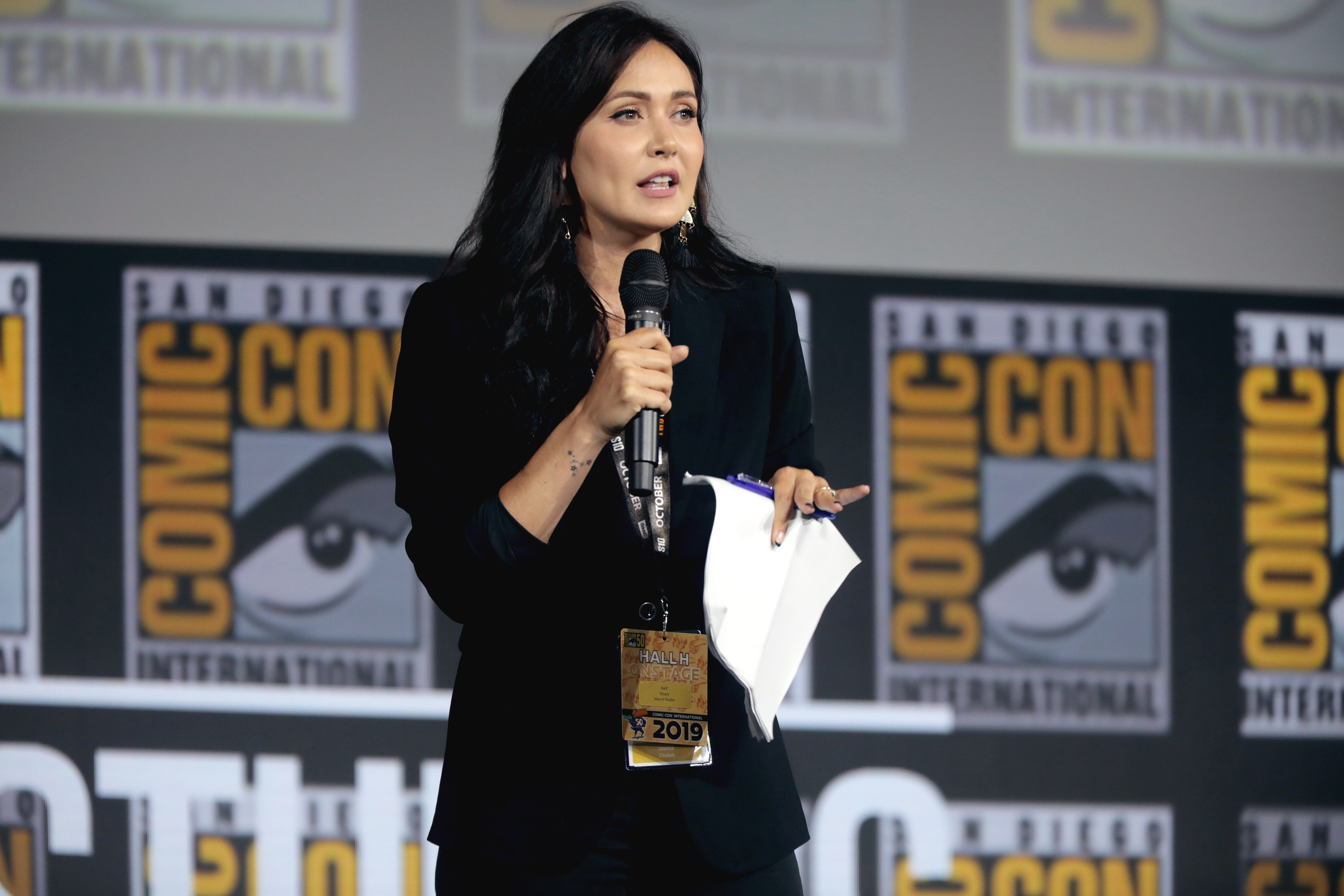
Chobot at the 2019 San Diego Comic Con

=== Early career (2005-2009) ===
Chobot gained widespread attention in 2005 when Kotaku published a viral photo of her licking a Sony PSP handheld console. The image was widely parodied, including Sony-branded advertisements.

In 2006, she joined IGN.com as a full-time host, appearing on IGN Weekly, IGN Strategize, and other programming. Her segments included stand-up commentary and "woman-on-the-street" features. From 2006-2009, she also contributed written content to IGN, including reviews, features, and blog posts.

Chobot wrote for FHM UK, appeared on G4's Filter and Attack of the Show!, and hosted a gaming preview segment for Fuel TV's The Daily Habit. She co-hosted Gamer's Dojo on Lifeskool TV and appeared as a regular guest on Maxim Radio. In addition to guest appearances, she also wrote a weekly blog for Maxim called Ask Jess, Dammit!.

=== IGN and media work (2009-2013) ===
From 2009-2011, Chobot hosted IGN’s Daily Fix, a weekday news show focused on gaming and tech updates. She also continued to host IGN's X-Box based programming, including Strategize for Inside Xbox.

In 2011, Chobot co-hosted the G4 series Proving Ground with Ryan Dunn. The show was temporarily pulled from the air following Dunn's death but resumed airing in July 2011 to complete its season.

She appeared in advertising for ADV's Anime Network, collaborated with Symbiote Studios Toy Company on two limited-edition anime-style collectibles, and modeled for the J!NX gamer apparel line. In 2007. Chobot was credited with instigating the development of Soul Code, a futuristic screenplay written by Tron director Steven Lisberger, which was sold to Reliant Pictures for mid-six figures.

=== Nerdist era (2013-2019) ===
On November 4, 2013, Chobot became the host of Nerdist News, a pop culture news series produced by Nerdist Industries airing five days a week on Nerdist.com. In addition to Nerdist News, she also hosted Nerdist News Talks Back which aired every Friday. The show was designed to go beyond the headlines as a panel of commentators tackled topics in film, television, comics, gaming, and more. From 2016 through 2018, Chobot co-hosted Mothership], a live interactive variety show produced for Nerdist under the Project Alpha banner, with Hector Navarro.

On June 26, 2014, she launched Bizarre States, a podcast focused on the paranormal, conspiracy theories, true crime, and fringe phenomena. The show was co-hosted by fellow Nerdist Industries writer and director Andrew Bowser and featured guest interviews, personal stories, and odd news stories. It ran under the Nerdist umbrella through 2019.

In 2017 Nerdist took the podcast from the studio to the field in a miniseries called Bizarre States: Los Angeles. The series was a six-episode show that was hosted on Project Alpha, which investigated spooky locations in the greater Los Angeles area. The series returned for a second season, hosted under the name Bizarre States: California.

Chobot announced her departure from Nerdist on August 5, 2019, after six years with the company.

=== Video game involvement ===
In 2012, Chobot appeared in Mass Effect 3 as the voice and likeness of Diana Allers (a non-player character), a journalist and potential romantic companion for the player character, Commander Shepard. Her inclusion sparked debate about journalistic ethics, given her role in games media. Though Chobot hosted preview coverage for the game on G4, she and the outlets she worked with publicly stated she would not review the title in any official capacity.

Reception to her appearance was mixed. Critics such as GameSpot's Kevin VanOrd stated that her appearance "seem[ed] more like a calculated marketing ploy than a union of creative talents", while others noted the challenge of separating entertainment personalities from journalistic roles. In response to the controversy, Chobot stated that she had never considered herself a journalist, emphasizing that she was hired as an on-screen personality and that BioWare never asked her for any favors in return.

Chobot later served as the writer for Daylight, a survival horror videogame developed by Zombie Studios. The game was released on April 29, 2014, for PC and PlayStation 4. The game received mixed reviews but was praised for its visuals.

Chobot co-hosted the 20th, 21st, 23rd, 24th, and 25th annual ceremonies of D.I.C.E. Awards with Greg Miller.

=== Film and television ===
In 2011, Chobot appeared in a minor role as Abbey, a bartender, in Cross, a semi-mythological superhero action film directed by Patrick Durham. Although the film received largely negative reviews, it has developed a small cult following and has spawned sequels. Chobot has not appeared in any of the sequels.

In March 2012, Jessica joined the Travel Channel as a co-host of Sand Wars, a two-part reality special where teams of sand sculptors competed against each other to build sand art.

In 2015, Chobot joined the sixth season of Battlebots as a sideline reporter. That same year, she portrayed Samus Aran in Metroid: The Sky Calls, a short fan film produced by Rainfall Films. She shared the role with voice actor and stunt performer America Young.

In 2017, she hosted "Player vs Player" a competitive debate series focused on the world of esports featuring a new group of expert panelists every week. It was originally aired on Hulu and ran for a single season with ten episodes.

Chobot joined the Discovery Channel series Expedition X, as a co-host when it premiered on February 12, 2020. The show, a paranormal investigative spinoff of Expedition Unknown, featured Chobot alongside Phill Torres and host Josh Gates. Chobot appeared in seasons one through seven, but did not return for season eight.

In 2025, Jessica Chobot appeared in the Discovery Channel mini series Bigfoot Took Her, along with co-host Robert Collier, a law enforcement official. The documentary-style true crime series reexamined the missing persons case of teenager Theresa Bier.

=== Podcasts ===
In 2019, she teamed up with Dell Technologies to host AI: Hype vs. Reality. A six-episode podcast that put current AI to the test and separated the hype from reality.

After leaving Nerdist Industries, Chobot and Bowser co-hosted The Untold Hour under the Starburns Audio network, continuing their collaborative work in paranormal podcasting. The show ran for 69 episodes from March 18, 2020 to September 1, 2021, before going on hiatus as Bowser began production on his film Onyx the Fortuitous and the Talisman of Souls, and Chobot focused on her work with Expedition X.

In 2022, Chobot independently revived the Bizarre States brand as Bizarre States Resurrected, releasing 25 episodes featuring solo commentary and occasional guest segments. Though no formal conclusion was announced, the series ended after a short run. As of July 2025, these episodes remain accessible via podcast platforms, though the RSS feed was repurposed in the late spring of 2025 for her next show, Occulture Shock.

On June 23, 2025, Chobot launched a podcast titled Occulture Shock on Patreon, continuing her exploration of the paranormal, the occult, and esoteric history.

=== Honors ===
Chobot was ranked 88th on AskMen magazine's "Most Desirable Woman" list in 2008 and 57th in their 2011 "Top 99 Women" poll. In 2009, Business Pundit named her the 14th "Hottest Woman of Business"

== Personal life ==
She was previously married and divorced in 2006 but retained the surname Chobot.

On August 21, 2011, she became engaged to fellow media personality Blair Herter. The couple married on February 18, 2012, and had their first child on March 6, 2013.

In 2022, the family relocated to the Netherlands following Herter's departure from G4 and subsequent position with the esports organization Team Liquid.
