= Onyx the Fortuitous and the Talisman of Souls =

- Directed by: Andrew Bowser
- Written by: Andrew Bowser
- Screenplay by: Andrew Bowser
- Produced by: Elizabeth Aspenlieder, Clark Baker, Olivia Taylor Dudley, Jeremy Hunt, Michael Mobley
- Starring: Andrew Bowser; Olivia Taylor Dudley; Rivkah Reyes; Melanie Chandra; Terrence C. Carson; Arden Myrin; Jeffrey Combs; Barbara Crampton; Ryan Stanger
- Cinematography: Dan Adlerstein
- Edited by: Andrew Bowser
- Music by: Matt Mahaffey
- Production company: Fortuitous Films
- Distributed by: Fathom Entertainment
- Release dates: 22 January 2023 (Sundance); 19 October 2023 (United States)
- Running time: 110 min
- Country: United States
- Language: English
- Box office: $182,021

Onyx the Fortuitous and the Talisman of Souls is a 2023 independent comedy horror by American filmmaker Andrew Bowser.

== Plot ==
The film tells the story of Marcus J. Trillbury, a shy, nerdy, socially awkward fast-food cook who, in his spare time, assumes the persona of his self-proclaimed alter ego "Onyx the Fortuitous": an amateur occultist with an insatiable desire for significance. Onyx enters an online competition and, along with four other competitors, wins a spot for an exclusive weekend with the famed occultist Bartok the Great. When Bartok and his assistant Farrah lead the winning group through a series of rituals promising eternal life, Trillbury is the only one of Bartok's fans who realizes Bartok's sinister intentions. While the promise of eternal life is not a lie, Bartok leaves out that the participants are transformed into soulless ghouls to attain it. Bartok's goal, however, is to summon the demon Abaddon and absorb his power. To do this, the "Talisman of Souls" must be charged. Bartok almost succeeds. However, Onyx is ultimately able to use the talisman to reverse the spell; the demon Abaddon is summoned, but instead of Bartok gaining Abaddon's power, Abaddon absorbs Bartok and is thus dragged into Hell himself.

== Cast ==
- Andrew Bowser as Onyx the Fortuitous
- Olivia Taylor Dudley as Farrah
- Rivkah Reyes as Mack
- Melanie Chandra as Jesminder
- Terrence C. Carson as Mr. Duke
- Arden Myrin as Shelley
- Jeffrey Combs as Bartok the Great
- Barbara Crampton as Nancy
- Ryan Stanger as Todd

== Background and production ==
In the years prior to production, filmmaker Andrew Bowser had published several short videos on YouTube in which he portrayed a nerd or geek who was randomly interviewed. Viewers sometimes initially assumed that these were real interviews, as the videos were also composed of scenes taken from real reports. The comedy videos were each viewed several million times. At the end of 2020, Bowser launched a crowdfunding campaign on Kickstarter to realize his idea for a feature film about the character he had developed and played over the years in the short YouTube videos. The pre-financing for the film production was successful; approximately 7,500 backers donated 610,000 US dollars.

The independent film was largely shot in Lenox, Massachusetts, at the Ventfort Hall Mansion and Gilded Age Museum.

According to Bowser and several actors involved in the film, Onyx the Fortuitous and the Talisman of Souls was inspired by comedy horror films released in the 1980s and 1990s. Bowser stated that the film has a strong connection to Fright Night and Gremlins in particular. Other sources of inspiration included the films Pee-Wee's Big Adventure, Beetlejuice, Ghostbusters, and Ernest Scared Stupid.

== Release, sales and reception ==
The film premiered at the 2023 Sundance Film Festival in January 2023. The film was briefly shown in select theaters in the United States and grossed approximately $182,000.

Rotten Tomatoes gives the film a rating of 66% based on 38 reviews.
