= Darine Hotait =

American film director and writer

- Born: Beirut, Lebanon
- Citizenship: United States of America
- Education: Art Center College of Design
- Occupations: Director; writer
- Years active: 2008 – present

Darine Hotait is an American film director and writer of Lebanese descent. She is best known for her narrative short films, Beirut Hide & Seek, I Say Dust, Like Salt, Tallahassee, Sherman, and It's Complicated.

== Early life and education ==
Darine Hotait was born in Beirut, Lebanon. At an early age, her family emigrated to the United States of America. She graduated with an MFA in screenwriting and film directing from the ArtCenter College of Design in Pasadena, California. In 2010, she founded Cinephilia Productions, a New York-based film incubator and production company. In 2025, she co-founded Route 243.

== Career ==
Hotait's short film, I Say Dust, starring Hala Alyan and Mounia Akl, which premiered at Outfest in 2015. The film was banned from screening in some Arab countries for portraying a kiss between two women on screen. In 2018, her short film, Like Salt, starring Jessica Damouni and Ben Williams, received the Best Film Award at the Oscar-qualifying Reel Sisters of the Diaspora Festival. In 2019, she received the New York State Council on the Arts Individual Artist Award.

In 2021, Hotait released her film, Tallahassee starring Cherien Dabis, Hala Alyan, and Samia Halaby, premiered at the 10th Blackstar Film Festival and was released exclusively by The New Yorker in January 2022. She directed the music video of Grammy-nominated album 'ONA' by singer Thana Alexa, premiered on Forbes. In 2022, She released her film Sherman, starring Zainab Jah, premiered at the 30th Pan African Film Festival.

In 2026, her film It's Complicated premiered at Hollyshorts Film Festival. The film was executive produced by Zoe Saldaña.

In 2026, Darine directed the off-broadway play MOKEB at the AMT Theater in Manhattan.

== Bibliography ==
=== Essays ===
- "The Balloons Were Not Balloons: On Chemical Weapons, Contaminated Lands, and Bodies That Remember War" in Everything is Political, June 2026.

=== Anthologies ===
- "An Arab Woman of No Importance" in Uncertain Girls in Uncertain Times Anthology, published by Red Hen Press (November 16, 2026)

=== Stage Plays ===
- "Imagine The City" in The Seventh Wave, April 2016
- "Sew A Side" in Rusted Radishes

== Filmography ==
=== Films ===
Year	Title	Director	Writer	Producer	Ref.
2009	The Far Side of Laughter	Yes	Yes	Yes	
2009	Command or Truth	Yes	Yes	Yes	
2011	Beirut... Hide & Seek	Yes	Yes	Yes	
2013	Ash			Yes	
2015	I Say Dust	Yes	Yes		
2018	Like Salt	Yes	Yes		
2021	Tallahassee	Yes		Yes	
2022	Sherman	Yes			
2025	Baadarane			Yes	
2026	It's Complicated	Yes	Story		

=== Music video ===
Year	Title	Artist	Director	Ref.
2021	"ONA"	Thana Alexa	Yes	

== Awards and nominations ==
Year	Award	Category	Work	Result	Ref.
2016	Outfest	Outstanding Narrative Short Film	I Say Dust	Nominated	
2018	Marfa Film Festival	Best Short Film	Like Salt	Nominated	
2018	Carthage Film Festival	Narrative Short Film	Like Salt	Nominated	
2021	Woodstock Film Festival	Best Short Film	Tallahassee	Nominated	
2021	El Gouna Film Festival	Short Films Competition	Tallahassee	Nominated	
2021	Boston Palestine Film Festival	Best Narrative Short	Tallahassee	Won	
2021	Mizna	Best Narrative Short	Tallahassee	Won	
