= GeekChicDaily =

Publisher of pop culture

GeekChicDaily (founded in October, 2009) was a multi-platform publisher of pop culture based newsletters, founded by Peter Levin and Gareb Shamus and operated by CEO Peter Levin.

== Publication ==
The now-defunct publisher had multiple newsletter publications including GeekChicDaily, GeekChic Los Angeles and GeekChicNYC. The targets for the newsletters were socially active consumers of genre fare. Rebranded as Nerdist News post merger with Nerdist Industries.

== History ==
CEO Peter Levin and Gareb Shamus launched GeekChicDaily with Peter Guber and other advisors in October, 2009. The company launched GeekChic Los Angeles, a regional version of the newsletter, in April 2011. GeekChicNYC was later added in August 2011. The offices are based out of Santa Monica, California.

=== Nerdist ===
Comedian Chris Hardwick's Nerdist Industries, entered into an equity partnership with GeekChicDaily in June 2011. Nerdist Industries operates a podcast network, including the flagship Nerdist Podcast, Nerdist Blog and NerdMelt theater at Meltdown Comics in Los Angeles. On the Nerdist Blog, Hardwick stated that "Peter Levin, founder of GeekChicDaily, will take over the business-y parts of the growing Nerdist tentacles."

In February 2012, GeekChicDaily fully merged with Nerdist Industries and became Nerdist News.
