= Kate Ryan (filmmaker) =

American film editor and director

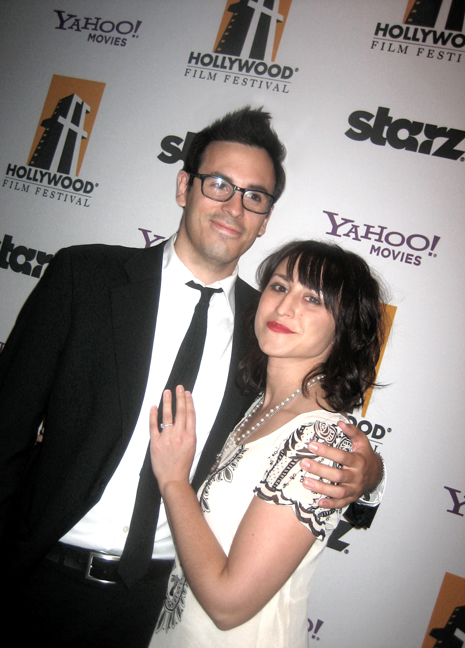
- Kate Ryan with husband Petrick at the 2009 Hollywood Film Awards
- Occupations: Film editor, Director
- Years active: 2000–present
- Spouse: Joseph M. Petrick (2010-Present)

Kate Ryan is an American director and editor known mostly from her 2007 film Point of View: A Dogumentary which was featured on The Dog Whisperer and won a 2007 Student Emmy Award. It was also a regional finalist for the Student Academy Awards.

She is currently working on a feature documentary entitled Welcome Nowhere which documents the trials and tribulations of a persecuted community of Romani people living in a settlement of box cars in Bulgaria. "Welcome Nowhere" is narrated by Ethan Hawke.,

== Early life and career ==
Kate Ryan was born in Los Angeles, California. A graduate of California State University, Northridge, where she majored in film, she began making short films and documentaries in 2000.

Her 2007 thesis film, Point of View: A Dogumentary, won a Student Emmy Award for Best Documentary, and was a regional finalist for the Student Academy Awards.

Other films she has directed and edited include: Miracles: The Chloe Glassborow Story (2009), Miracles: The Per Arne Drangsland Story (2008), which premiered on the Trinity Broadcasting Network, and Catch the Fire: Fruits of Revival (2009).

Her editing work also includes the television shows Hope for Your Home (2008), Restorer Guy (2009) all for TLC (TV channel), as well as the second season of AMC's "The Pitch". She has also served as a casting editor for seasons 2-5 of CBS' Emmy-Award-winning "Undercover Boss".

In 2009 she was a camera operator on the independent film The Mother of Invention and an assistant director on the film Ashes.

She is currently working on the feature-length documentary Welcome Nowhere.
