= Nerdist News =

American pop culture newsletter

- Company type: Newsletter
- Founded: February 2012
- Founders: Peter Levin; Chris Hardwick
- Headquarters: United States

Nerdist News is a Nerdist-branded pop culture newsletter launched in February 2012. It was founded and operated by Nerdist Industries' CEO, Peter Levin, and its CCO, Chris Hardwick. It was hosted by Jessica Chobot.

== Publication ==
The cross-platform Nerdist Industries currently has two newsletter publications, Nerdist News and Tokyopop. The target for the newsletters is socially active consumers of genre fare.

=== Nerdist ===
Comedian Chris Hardwick's Nerdist Industries, entered into an equity partnership with GeekChicDaily in June 2011. Nerdist Industries operates a podcast network, including the flagship Nerdist Podcast (renamed ID10T with Chris Hardwick in February 2018), Nerdist Blog and NerdMelt theater at Meltdown Comics in Los Angeles.

In February 2012, GeekChicDaily fully merged with Nerdist Industries and became Nerdist News, though the Nerdist News website has not updated since September 20, 2014, with ongoing content shifted to the main Nerdist.com page.
