= Ruby Wendell =

American actress and comedian (born 1979)

- Born: Ruby Wendell; Iowa City, Iowa
- Occupations: Actress, Comedian
- Years active: 2002–present
- Website: http://www.rubyjwendell.com

Ruby Wendell (born 1979) is an American actress and comedian. She has appeared on Last Comic Standing and has acted in independent films such as The Mother of Invention, I'm Not Like That No More and Ashes.

== Biography ==
Ruby Wendell was born in Iowa City, Iowa. Her brother is writer/director Joseph M. Petrick. She attended the American Academy of Dramatic Arts and the British American Drama Academy in Oxford. Her grandfather was Howard Wendell, a character actor who appeared in, among other films: Prince Valiant (1954 film), Affair in Trinidad and Gentlemen Prefer Blondes.

== Career ==
Ruby Wendell has been an active stand-up comic since 2002 and in 2008 appeared on the NBC comedy reality show Last Comic Standing. In 2009 she appeared in the independent films The Mother of Invention as Jenny, I'm Not Like That No More as Leti and Ashes as Emily, which she also produced. The same year she had a small role in Paul Blart: Mall Cop as Ruby the Waitress.

Filmmaker Wim Wenders picked the short film Four Years, Six Months that starred Wendell and actor Keir O'Donnell as one of his favorite short films on the website Filmaka.com.
