= Landlocked Film Festival =

Landlocked Film Festival is an annual film festival hosted in Iowa City, Iowa. The Festival was founded in 2007. Landlocked Film Festival was created to support independent filmmaking by bringing the best of independent world cinema to the American heartland, by providing workshops led by experts in their fields, and by fostering a dialogue between audiences and filmmakers. The primary venue for the festival is the Englert Theatre but the festival also has screenings, panels, and workshops in other venues.

The third annual festival, which took place from August 27–30, 2009, featured Iowa-made film 16 to Life and the Danish Film Program.

Veteran character actor Googy Gress attended the fourth annual festival which took place from August 26–29, 2010, with his film Ashley's Ashes. Other filmmakers in attendance included David Crabtree, editor and director of Psych, and John Putch, director of comedy television including Cougar Town and Scrubs.

Festival director Mary Blackwood says that Landlocked audiences number 4000 and that 80 filmmakers are scheduled to attend the 2010 festival.

== See also ==
- List of film festivals
- Film festivals in North and Central America
