= Almost There (The Academy Is... album) =

Studio album by the Academy Is...
- Released: March 27, 2026
- Recorded: 2024–2025
- Genre: Alternative rock; power pop; indie rock; pop-punk
- Length: 36:03
- Label: I Surrender Records
- Producer: Snow Ellet

The Academy Is... chronology
Lost in Pacific Time: The AP/EP (2009)	Almost There (2026)

Singles from Almost There
- 1. "2005" Released: January 14, 2026; 2. "Miracle" Released: February 18, 2026; 3. "L Train" Released: March 11, 2026

Almost There is the fourth studio album from rock band the Academy Is.... The band's first album in 18 years, it was released on March 27, 2026 through I Surrender Records.

== Background and recording ==
Following the band's breakup in 2011, the band reunited once in 2015 to play their album Almost Here cover-to-cover at Riot Fest. The band fully reunited in 2022 where they, again announced they would play at Riot Fest and indicated their reunion would be a return to full-time playing. Throughout 2022 and 2023, the band began playing at various music festivals and opening for various music acts including Fall Out Boy and Andrew McMahon.

In late 2025, the band embarked on a tour to celebrate the 20th anniversary of their debut album, Almost Here. During the tour, they announced they would be releasing a new album in 2026, and debuted new songs to concertgoers.

== Critical reception ==
Professional ratings
Review scores
Source	Rating
Indy Review	3.5/5 stars
New Noise	5/5 stars

Upon release, Almost There was well-received by contemporary music critics. Writing for New Noise, Kayla Moreno gave the album a perfect five stars out of five saying "Almost There is the best-case scenario for a reunited band. It acknowledges their past without repeating it, alluding to a much brighter future. Of course, growth is not like coasting down a highway; it’s more like cascading down a hillside and hoping to land on solid ground. Thankfully, The Academy Is… have done just that. They’re not back to perform caricatures of their former selves. Instead, The Academy Is… shows us who they have become while we were all apart."

Writing for Indy Review, David M Rangel said the album is a "more controlled, confident instrumentation" compared to the band's previous works. Rangel further said that the band has "presented a record that captures all the best aspects of a certain time in music, without sounding stale or dated. Their style of shimmering pop will likely appeal to mainstream radio listeners, as well as lovers of off-the-beaten-path indie music."

== Track listing ==
All tracks are written by William Beckett and Mike Carden; "Freak Out" written with David Pramik and Jamie Sherman.

Almost There track listing
No.	Title	Length
1.	"Up in the Air"	3:20
2.	"Miracle"	2:41
3.	"2005"	3:52
4.	"Freak Out"	2:48
5.	"Snow Days"	3:34
6.	"100mph"	3:33
7.	"Floating Through Time (Interlude)"	1:21
8.	"L Train"	3:42
9.	"Lost Signals"	3:04
10.	"Lulu Boy"	3:28
11.	"Ten Years"	4:40
Total length:		36:03

== Personnel ==
Credits adapted from Tidal.

=== The Academy Is... ===
- William Beckett – vocals
- Mike Carden – guitar
- Andy Mrotek – drums
- Adam Siska – bass

=== Additional contributors ===
- Snow Ellet – production, engineering
- Nick Rad – mixing
- Steven Servi – mixing assistance
- Mike Cervantes – mastering
