= Fast Times at Barrington High =

Studio album by The Academy Is...
- Released: August 19, 2008
- Recorded: Spring–Summer 2008
- Studio: Avatar, New York City, New York
- Genre: Pop-punk; power pop; alternative rock; emo pop
- Length: 43:08
- Label: Fueled by Ramen, Decaydance, Atlantic
- Producer: S*A*M and Sluggo

The Academy Is... chronology
Santi (2007)	Fast Times at Barrington High (2008)	Lost in Pacific Time: The AP/EP (2009)

Singles from Fast Times at Barrington High
- 1. "About a Girl" Released: July 15, 2008; 2. "Summer Hair = Forever Young" Released: September 12, 2008; 3. "His Girl Friday" Released: 2009; 4. "The Test" Released: 2009

Fast Times at Barrington High is the third album by American rock band The Academy Is..., released on August 19, 2008.

== Background ==
Fast Times at Barrington High was produced by S*A*M and Sluggo. The title refers to the high school to which William Beckett and Adam Siska went, and is a play on the title of the 1982 film Fast Times at Ridgemont High. The album cover photo was taken by William Beckett's sister, Courtney Beckett, and shows William sitting on a couch with Naomi, who was guitarist Michael Guy Chislett's girlfriend at the time, whom he later married.

Pete Wentz posted a blog entry saying that he heard the demos for the new album and called them, "Mind blowing. Miles away from where they were." Collaborations include Andrew McMahon from Jack's Mannequin; Gabe Saporta, Ryland Blackinton and Alex Suarez from Cobra Starship; and Mason Musso and Blake Healy from Metro Station.

== Release ==
In May 2008, the band performed at SunFest. On June 26, 2008, Fast Times at Barrington High was announced for release in two months' time. Between June and August 2008, the band performed on the Warped Tour. In between dates on this tour, they performed a handful of shows with artists on Decaydance Records. The band performed "About a Girl" and "Summer Hair = Forever Young" on Warped Tour and their Australian tour with Panic! at the Disco and Cobra Starship. Hot Topic released two new The Academy Is... T-shirts, one of which comes with a code for the free download of an acoustic version of "His Girl Friday".

The first single off the album is "About a Girl", which was released on July 15, 2008. On July 23, "Summer Hair = Forever Young" was posted on the group's Myspace profile. "About a Girl" impacted radio on August 12. Fast Times at Barrington High was released through Fueled by Ramen and Decaydance Records on August 19. The Academy Is... held a contest for releasing new tracks, email addresses were entered on a page off the main website page and 8 winners were selected at random to receive a song off the album and also a call from the band and a free signed copy of Fast Times at Barrington High. In October and November, the band went on a headlining US tour, titled Bill & Trav's Bogus Journey Tour. They were supported by We the Kings, Carolina Liar and Hey Monday. In April 2009, the group performed at Give it a Name festival in the UK and Groezrock in Belgium. In August, the band went on a tour of Australia with Anberlin.

== Reception ==
Professional ratings
Review scores
Source	Rating
AbsolutePunk	(68%)
Allmusic	4/5 stars
Alternative Press	3/5 stars
Entertainment Weekly	(B+)
IGN	7.5/10
Melodic	5/5 stars
The New York Times	(favorable)
Rolling Stone	3/5 stars
Spin	3.5/5 stars

The album sold 35,000 copies in its first week, debuting at number 17 on the Billboard 200. It was named the 46th best album of 2008 by Rolling Stone. By October 2009, the album's sales stood at 85,000.

== Track listing ==
All lyrics written by William Beckett; all music composed by The Academy Is... with Sam Hollander and Dave Katz on tracks 1–6 and 11.

Standard Edition

1. "About a Girl" – 3:30
2. "Summer Hair = Forever Young" – 3:39
3. "His Girl Friday" – 3:41
4. "The Test" – 3:29
5. "Rumored Nights" – 3:45
6. "Automatic Eyes" – 3:26
7. "Crowded Room" – 3:07
8. "Coppertone" – 3:18
9. "After the Last Midtown Show" – 5:13
10. "Beware! Cougar!" – 3:38
11. "Paper Chase" – 3:30
12. "One More Weekend" – 3:43

iTunes Bonus Tracks

1. "Every Burden Has a Version" – 4:08
2. "Sodium" – 3:46
3. "About a Girl" (Acoustic version) – 3:22

Hot Topic Bonus Track

1. "His Girl Friday" (Acoustic version) – 3:42

7" Vinyl Bonus Track

1. "Tokyo Bay" – 2:59

== Personnel ==
- William Beckett – lead vocals, guitar, piano
- Mike Carden – rhythm guitar, backing vocals
- Adam T. Siska – bass guitar, backing vocals
- Andy "The Butcher" Mrotek – drums, percussion, backing vocals
- Michael Guy Chislett – lead guitar, backing vocals

== Contributions ==
- Gabe Saporta (Cobra Starship & Midtown) – additional vocals on "Crowded Room".
- Mason Musso (Metro Station) – additional vocals on "Crowded Room".
- Andrew McMahon (Jack's Mannequin & Something Corporate) – piano on "After the Last Midtown Show".
- Ryland Blackinton (Cobra Starship) – additional vocals on "About a Girl".
- Alex Suarez (Cobra Starship) – additional vocals on "His Girl Friday".
- Blake Healy (Metro Station) – piano on "His Girl Friday" and "Summer Hair = Forever Young".

== Charts ==
Chart (2008)	Peak position
Australian Albums (ARIA)	30
Canadian Albums (Nielsen SoundScan)	40
US Billboard 200	17
US Top Alternative Albums (Billboard)	5
US Top Rock Albums (Billboard)	5

== Release history ==
Country	Release date
New Zealand	August 18, 2008
United Kingdom	August 18, 2008
United States	August 19, 2008
Australia	August 23, 2008
