= Santi (album) =

Studio album by The Academy Is...
- Released: April 2, 2007
- Recorded: October 2006
- Studios: Pulse Recording, Silver Lake
- Genres: Alternative rock; indie rock; pop-punk; emo pop; pop rock
- Length: 39:26
- Labels: Fueled by Ramen; Decaydance; Atlantic
- Producer: Butch Walker

The Academy Is... chronology
From the Carpet (2006)	Santi (2007)	Fast Times at Barrington High (2008)

Singles from Santi
- 1. "We've Got a Big Mess on Our Hands" Released: March 13, 2007; 2. "Everything We Had" Released: July 17, 2007; 3. "Neighbors" Released: August 4, 2007

Santi is the second studio album by American rock band The Academy Is..., released on April 2, 2007 by Fueled by Ramen, Decaydance Records and Atlantic Records. It is their first release to feature Michael Guy Chislett on lead guitar after Tom Conrad's departure from the band.

== Background ==
On October 24, 2006, it was announced that guitarist Tom Conrad had been removed from the band. In the same announcement, it was revealed that the group was writing the follow-up to Almost Here.

=== Title ===
The album's working title was Chop Chop. William Beckett has explained the origin of Santi and how it came to be the album title in the Australian music magazine Blunt in the following story:

"Adam and I went to the same high school, and there was this dude named Josh Santiago who we went to school with. I was doing a solo project at the time, and I was listening to different music than most people – stuff like The Get Up Kids, The Promise Ring and Jimmy Eat World – and people there just didn't get me or what I was like. So this one guy in particular, Josh Santiago, gave me a hell of a time, like busted my chops and called me negative names like "fag" and stuff. Anyway, he had a Dave Matthews cover band called Santi, because his name was Santiago and he's just that kind of guy. So we started saying Santi as everything that wasn't him – everything that was positive, just because he was such a negative dude and such a terrible person. So we started saying santi as something funny or cool, kinda like "cheers" or we say it as a greeting, like, 'Whats up, Santi?' So it's a word we've been using for a long time and when it came time to name the record we listened to it and went like, 'Santi!' – it always had to be the name."

== Release ==
The first preview of the album was provided by Johnny Minardi of Snakes and Suits fame on January 26, 2007, when he gave the song, "LAX to O'Hare", to Absolutepunk.net for streaming on their site. "We've Got a Big Mess on Our Hands" was announced as the first single from the album; it was posted on their PureVolume profile on February 6, 2007, before being released to radio on March 13. They embarked on a UK tour with the Audition. On March 27, Santi was made available for streaming, and on April 3, was released through Fueled By Ramen. From early May to early July, the band supported Fall Out Boy on the 2007 edition of the Honda Civic Tour. "Everything We Had" was released to radio on July 17. From early September to late November, the band went on their first headlining tour, titled Sleeping with Giants. They were supported by Armor for Sleep, the Rocket Summer, Sherwood and Cobra Starship. In the midst of this, the band appeared at the Street Scene festival. A music video for "Everything We Had" was posted online on September 14, 2007. A music video for "Same Blood" was released on December 12, featuring footage from a performance in Japan.

The music video for "Neighbors", shows the band at a concert, and in various other scenarios. There are cameos from different bands participating in the Honda Civic Tour, such as Mark Hoppus of +44 and Blink-182, Andy Hurley, Pete Wentz and Joe Trohman of Fall Out Boy and Gabe Saporta of Midtown and Cobra Starship.

== Reception ==
Professional ratings
Review scores
Source	Rating
AbsolutePunk.net	(84%)
Allmusic	3.5/5 stars
Blender	3/5 stars
IGN	5.3/10
Rolling Stone	2.5/5 stars
Spin	2/5 stars

In its first week of sales in the U.S., the album sold 33,000 copies, debuting at number 32 on the Billboard 200 and #94 on the UK Albums Chart. By October 2009, the album's sales stood at 132,000. idobi Radio included the album on their best of 2007 list.

== Track listing ==
All music written by The Academy Is.... All lyrics written by William Beckett.

=== Standard edition ===
1. "Same Blood" – 3:14
2. "LAX to O'Hare" – 3:36
3. "We've Got a Big Mess on Our Hands" – 3:26
4. "Sleeping with Giants (Lifetime)" – 3:36
5. "Everything We Had" – 3:38
6. "Bulls in Brooklyn" – 3:27
7. "Neighbors" – 3:10
8. "Seed" – 4:17
9. "Chop Chop" – 3:26
10. "You Might Have Noticed" – 3:22
11. "Unexpected Places" – 4:15

=== Best Buy Bonus Tracks ===
12. "Ghost" – 3:51
13. "Everything We Had" (One Take acoustic mix) – 4:11

=== iTunes Bonus Tracks ===
12. "Toasted Skin" – 3:55
13. "40 Steps" – 4:29
- The bonus tracks on iTunes have since been removed for an unknown reason.

== Personnel ==
- William Beckett – lead vocals, guitar, piano
- Mike Carden – rhythm guitar, backing vocals
- Adam T. Siska – bass guitar, backing vocals
- Andy "The Butcher" Mrotek – drums, percussion, backing vocals
- Michael Guy Chislett – lead guitar, backing vocals

== Charts ==
Chart performance
Chart (2007)	Peak position
Australian Hitseekers Albums (ARIA)	8
Scottish Albums (Official Charts)	86
UK Albums (Official Charts)	94
US Billboard 200	32
US Top Rock Albums (Billboard)	7
