= Genuine & Counterfeit =

Studio album by William Beckett
- Released: August 20, 2013
- Genre: Pop rock
- Length: 39:12
- Label: Equal Vision
- Producer: Marc McClusky

William Beckett chronology
The Pioneer Sessions (2013)	Genuine & Counterfeit (2013)

Singles from Genuine & Counterfeit
- 1. "Benny & Joon" Released: June 18, 2013

Professional ratings
Review scores
Source	Rating
AbsolutePunk	8.5/10
Alter the Press	5/5 stars
The AU Review	7.7/10
Kill Your Stereo	28/100
Rock Sound	6/10

Genuine & Counterfeit is the first solo studio album by American singer William Beckett. The album is the first full-length released by William since the break-up of his band The Academy Is.... It was released by the New York-based independent record label, Equal Vision Records, and produced by Marc McClusky.

== Track listing ==
No.	Title	Length
1.	"Pick Up the Phone" (featuring Max Bemis of Say Anything)	3:22
2.	"In My Blood"	3:13
3.	"Benny & Joon"	3:40
4.	"Hanging On a Honeymoon"	3:20
5.	"Turn On the Light"	3:19
6.	"By Your Side"	3:23
7.	"Caught in the Middle"	3:37
8.	"One in the Same"	3:32
9.	"Cracks in the Ceiling"	3:21
10.	"Time for a Sign" (featuring Derek Sanders of Mayday Parade)	3:57
11.	"A Million People"	4:28
Total length:		39:12

== Charts ==
Chart performance for Genuine & Counterfeit
Chart (2013)	Peak position
US Billboard 200	156
US Independent Albums (Billboard)	35
US Top Rock Albums (Billboard)	49
