= Animals (EP) =

EP by Ryan Star
- Released: August 5, 2013
- Genre: Rock
- Length: 26:30
- Label: Ryan Star Ltd.
- Producer: IdoVsTheWorld

Ryan Star chronology
The America EP (2012)	Animals (2013)

Animals is the third EP from American rock singer Ryan Star, it became available on August 5, 2013 via all digital music stores. The EP included five new songs, including the new single Impossible

== Track listing ==
No.	Title	Writer(s)	Length
1.	"Bullet"	Ryan Star	7:36
2.	"World I Used to Know"	Star	5:11
3.	"F*ck'n Up"	Star	6:11
4.	"Impossible"	Star	3:16
5.	"My Life with You"	Star	4:16
Total length:			26:30
