= We've Got a Big Mess on Our Hands =

Single by The Academy Is...

from the album Santi
- Released: March 6, 2007
- Genre: Alternative rock, post-punk revival
- Length: 3:26
- Label: Fueled by Ramen
- Songwriters: William Beckett, Mike Carden, Michael Guy Chislett, Andy Mrotek
- Producer: Butch Walker

The Academy Is... singles chronology
"The Phrase that Pays" (2005)	"We've Got a Big Mess on Our Hands" (2007)	"Neighbors" (2007)

"We've Got a Big Mess on Our Hands" is the first single by The Academy Is... from their 2007 album Santi. The song impacted radio on March 13, 2007.

== Music video ==
The music video directed by Alan Ferguson focuses on William Beckett, beginning with a second more violent and unpleasant version of him leaving his apartment. The real William Beckett then follows, as his alter ego causes havoc. The final scene shows Beckett rushing onstage as the band is playing, and continually pummels his doppelganger. It then cuts to a show that there is no audience and no one is on stage except Beckett, implying that he hallucinated the entire incident, or that it was all a dream. The video directly crosses with Fall Out Boy's video single "Thnks fr th Mmrs", showing William Beckett on the phone with Pete Wentz; however, Wentz is having his makeup done at the time by one of the video's chimpanzees. "We've Got a Big Mess on Our Hands" has also been briefly featured on the second episode of the comedy series Aliens in America on The CW and also on Newport Harbor: The Real Orange County.

== Track listing ==
1. "We've Got a Big Mess on Our Hands" – 3:26
