= 11:59 =

11:59 may refer to:

- 11:59 (album), by Ryan Star
- "11:59" (Star Trek: Voyager), a 1999 episode of the television series Star Trek: Voyager
- "11:59", a song by Blondie from Parallel Lines
- "Eleven-Fifty-Nine", a 2016 episode of the television series Arrow

== See also ==
- Confusion at noon and midnight
- Doomsday Clock, frequently positioned at a time close to midnight
