= About a Girl =

About a Girl may refer to:

- "About a Girl" (Nirvana song)
- "About a Girl" (Sugababes song)
- "About a Girl" (The Academy Is... song)
- About a Girl (album), by Winter Gloves
- About a Girl (TV series), Canadian television series
- About a Girl (2001 film), short film
- About a Girl (2014 film), German film
- "About a Girl" (The Orville), a 2017 television episode

== See also ==
- About a Boy (disambiguation)
