= Winter Passing (song) =

Single by The Academy Is...
- Released: December 2, 2008
- Recorded: November, 2008
- Genre: Alternative rock
- Length: 4:28
- Label: Fueled by Ramen, Decaydance
- Songwriters: William Beckett, Michael Guy Chislett
- Producers: William Beckett, Michael Guy Chislett

The Academy Is... singles chronology
"Summer Hair = Forever Young" (2008)	"Winter Passing" (2008)	"His Girl Friday" (2009)

"Winter Passing" is a single by The Academy Is.... It was written and recorded on their bus during the last month of the Bill & Trav's Bogus Journey Tour. The cover for the single was painted by Andrew "The Butcher" Mrotek during that tour on November 13, 2008. It was released on December 2, 2008.

== Music video ==
The music video, directed by Jack (The Camera Guy) Edinger, features William walking around snow-covered streets in his neighborhood and Oak Park, and also cuts to him playing the guitar several times. The video was released on December 22, 2008 via The William Beckett Blog and YouTube.
