= Ribbons and Sugar =

Studio album by Gatsbys American Dream
- Released: July 1, 2003
- Genres: Progressive rock, pop punk, indie rock
- Length: 29:34
- Label: Rocketstar Recordings
- Producer: James Paul Wisner

Gatsbys American Dream chronology
Why We Fight (2002)	Ribbons and Sugar (2003)	In the Land of Lost Monsters (2004)

Professional ratings
Review scores
Source	Rating
Alternative Press	3/5

Gatsbys American Dream released their second album, Ribbons and Sugar, in 2003. As indicated by the title, the album is based loosely around the George Orwell fable Animal Farm.

== Album details ==
Ribbons and Sugar is notably different from the group's debut album, Why We Fight, which according to guitarist Bobby Darling is due to their unusual time signatures and a lack of choruses led to critical acclaim, however, it also led to various feuds with multiple record labels. "Cut the Strings" and later "The Dragon of Pendor" (featured on In the Land of Lost Monsters) dealt specifically with the integrity issues they faced when told to write choruses for their songs.

During the recording sessions of Ribbons and Sugar, the band consisted of Nic Newsham on vocals, Bobby Darling and Ryan Van Wieringen on both guitar and backup vocals, Kirk Huffman on bass, and Rudy Gajadhar on drums. The line up changed, however, before the recording of In the Land of Lost Monsters (for LLR Records) when Van Wieringen left the band to pursue a college education.

== Album title meaning ==
In the beginning of the novel (Animal Farm), a horse named Mollie who lives on the animal farm chews lumps of sugar and wears red ribbons in her white mane.

Excerpt from Animal Farm:

"Will there still be sugar after the Rebellion?"
"No," said Snowball firmly. "We have no means of making sugar on this farm. Besides, you do not need sugar. You will have all the oats and hay you want."
"And shall I still be allowed to wear ribbons in my mane?" asked Mollie.

"Comrade," said Snowball, "those ribbons that you are so devoted to are the badge of slavery. Can you not understand that liberty is worth more than ribbons?"

After the animals take over the farm, these two things are forbidden for animals to wear or eat, as they are determined to be things for humans and not for animals. Before long, Mollie runs away to another farm where she can eat sugar and wear ribbons in her mane. Near the end of the fable, the pigs who are the rulers and leaders of the Animal Farm begin to act more and more like humans, and even begin eating sugar and wearing ribbons.

== Track listing ==
1. "The Taming" – 1:22
2. "We're Not Orphans" – 2:45
3. "Epilogue" – 2:48
4. "Work, Lies, Sex, Love, Fear, Hate, Friendship" – 1:57
5. "A Manifesto of Tangible Wealth" – 2:07
6. "Snicker at the Swine" – 2:52
7. "Apparition" – 2:18
8. "Cut the Strings" – 3:20
9. "The Horse You Rode In On" – 2:17
10. "Recondition, Reprogram, Reactivate" – 2:27
11. "Counterfeit Language" – 4:51

== Personnel ==
- Nic Newsham - vocals
- Bobby Darling - guitar, vocals
- Ryan van Wieringen - guitar
- Kirk Huffman - bass, vocals
- Rudy Gajadhar - drums

=== Additional personnel ===
- Darrick Bourgeois - executive producer
- James Paul Wisner - producer; engineer; additional keyboards, guitars, and vocals
- Mark Green - assistant producer
- Yaeger Rosenberg - design, art direction
- Norma Mendoza - vocal coach
