= Lost in Pacific Time: The AP/EP =

EP by The Academy Is...
- Released: September 22, 2009
- Genre: Pop-punk; emo; alternative rock
- Length: 18:46
- Label: Fueled by Ramen, Decaydance

The Academy Is... chronology
Fast Times at Barrington High (2008)	Lost in Pacific Time: The AP/EP (2009)	Almost There (2026)

Lost in Pacific Time: The AP/EP is an EP by The Academy Is... It was released on September 22, 2009 to the iTunes Store, and was also sold on the AP Fall Ball Tour. A limited amount was also available from the band's website. The first track, "I'm Yours Tonight", was made available for play on The Academy Is...'s MySpace page. Another track, "Days Like Masquerades" was played at an anti-suicide benefit at Barrington High School, in Barrington, Illinois. It was the final release by the band before their disbandment in 2011 and eventual reformation in 2022. It is also their final release to feature lead guitarist Michael Guy Chislett.

Leading up to the release of the EP, William Beckett posted and linked lyrics from the EP on his blog. All the tracks are listed as "EP versions". "Sputter" also features Jack's Mannequin singer Andrew McMahon.

== Track listing ==
1. "I'm Yours Tonight" – 3:39
2. "Days Like Masquerades" – 3:32
3. "Sputter" (featuring Andrew McMahon of Jack's Mannequin) – 4:21
4. "New York (Saint in the City)" – 3:34
5. "In the Rearview" – 3:41

== Personnel ==
- William Beckett – vocals
- Michael Guy Chislett – lead guitar
- Mike Carden – rhythm guitar
- Adam T. Siska – bass
- Andy "The Butcher" Mrotek – drums
- Andrew McMahon - piano / backing vocals ("Sputter")
