= Everything We Had =

Single by The Academy Is...

from the album Santi
- Released: July 10, 2007
- Genre: Emo
- Length: 3:39
- Label: Fueled by Ramen
- Songwriters: William Beckett, Mike Carden, Michael Guy Chislett, Andy Mrotek
- Producer: Butch Walker

The Academy Is... singles chronology
"Neighbors" (2007)	"Everything We Had" (2007)	"Sleeping with Giants (Lifetime)" (2007)

"Everything We Had" is a single by the band The Academy Is... from their album Santi. The song debuted on the radio on July 17, 2007 and was featured in the soundtrack of the film P.S. I Love You.

This song was ranked #87 on MTV Asia's list of the Top 100 Hits of 2007.

== Music video ==
The music video is shown in rewind, from when William Beckett flies out of the pool he had previously thrown himself into. He then walks backward to where he had crushed a cake, and it rebuilds in rewind. He walks back and sits down on a couch. He then gets up again and walks back to where a woman, who appears to be his ex-girlfriend in the story, is yelling at him for showing up at her party. The marbles on a counter that she knocked down go back into the bowl, a present that she knocked out of Beckett's hands goes back into place, and she finally walks back to where she was talking to her friends. The video ends with Beckett singing the last line and walking away as the camera turns to where a sign on a wall says "Happy Birthday."

In some parts of the video Beckett is singing while video scenery and people are paused and static.

== Total Request Live ==
In September 2007, Total Request Live had a first look at the music video. On October 1 it made its countdown debut at #8, making it the second video by The Academy Is... to be seen on MTV, the first being "Toasted Skin".
