= Why We Fight (disambiguation) =

Why We Fight is a series of seven World War II propaganda films, mostly directed by Frank Capra.

Why We Fight may also refer to:

== Film and television ==
- Why We Fight (2005 film), a documentary on the U.S. military–industrial complex
- "Why We Fight" (Angel), a 2004 episode of the television series Angel
- "Why We Fight" (Band of Brothers), an episode of the miniseries Band of Brothers
- "Why We Fight" (Jericho), a 2007 episode of the television series Jericho
- "Why We Fight" (The Expanse), a 2022 episode of the television series The Expanse
- "Why We Fight" (Revolution), a 2014 episode of the television series Revolution

== Other ==
- Why We Fight (John Wesley Harding album), 1992
- Why We Fight (Gatsbys American Dream album), 2002
