= John W. Vanderpoel =

American bird watcher

John W. Vanderpoel (born October 11, 1949) is an American birdwatcher, birding guide, and author born in the Chicago suburb of Des Plaines, Illinois. With a degree in biology focusing on ornithology Vanderpoel completed a birding Big Year in 2011 where he saw 744 bird species in North America, placing him one species away from the all-time record. His book Full Chase Mode details his adventures during 2011.

== Personal life and education ==
John Vanderpoel was born in Des Plaines, a northwest Chicago suburb, to Ruth and Waid Vanderpoel. His father was a well-respected financier and conservationist whose love of nature was passed down to John. Vanderpoel was also the great nephew of noted painter John Vanderpoel. John attended Barrington High School and the University of Colorado Boulder, where he studied biology.

== Birding ==
Vanderpoel was the producer of the Advanced Birding Video Series, which released Small Gulls of North America, Large Gulls of North America, and Hummingbirds of North America.

== Works ==
- Full Chase Mode, John Vanderpoel, Buteo Books, 2021, ISBN 9780931130205
- Hummingbirds of North America, John Vanderpoel, Larry Rosche, and Jon L Dunn, Peregrine Video Productions, 2004
- Small Gulls of North America, John Vanderpoel, Larry Rosche, and Jon L Dunn, Peregrine Video Productions, 1999
- Large Gulls of North America, John Vanderpoel, Larry Rosche, and Jon L Dunn, Peregrine Video Productions, 1997
