= Winds Will Change EP =

Winds Will Change

EP by William Beckett
- Released: July 17, 2012
- Genre: Pop rock, pop
- Length: 13:43
- Label: YIKE Records

William Beckett chronology
Walk the Talk EP (2012)	Winds Will Change (2012)	What Will Be EP (2012)

Winds Will Change is the second EP by William Beckett. It was released on July 17, 2012 under YIKE Records. Beckett later recorded acoustic versions of every song on this EP for The Pioneer Sessions.

== Track listing ==
All tracks are written by William Beckett.

No.	Title	Length
1.	"Great Night"	3:00
2.	"Warriors"	3:12
3.	"Scarlet (Tokyo)"	3:20
4.	"Dig a Hole"	4:11
Total length:		13:43
