= Dark Horse – A Live Collection =

Dark Horse - A Live Collection

Live album by Ryan Star
- Released: September 22, 2006
- Genre: Rock
- Label: Burnett Records

Ryan Star chronology
Songs from the Eye of an Elephant (2005)	Dark Horse - A Live Collection (2006)	Last Train Home EP (2009)

Dark Horse – A Live Collection is an album by American singer/songwriter and Rock Star: Supernova contestant/6th place Ryan Star. Released only weeks after Star was eliminated from the show at the end of August 2006, a lot of the material on the album are his performances on the show, but there are some original songs as well. The recording with the Rock Star house band was set up by the CBS show producer Mark Burnett who also arranged the fast distribution of the album.

Ryan got the album title when Dave Navarro who was a judge with Supernova stated that he was the dark horse in the competition.

== Track listing ==
1. "Back of Your Car"
2. "Clocks" (Coldplay cover)
3. "In the Air Tonight" (Phil Collins cover)
4. "Sink or Swim"
5. "We Might Fall"
6. "O"
7. "Iris" (Goo Goo Dolls cover)
8. "Losing My Religion" (R.E.M. cover)
9. "I Alone" (Live cover)
10. "Perfect"
11. "Enjoy the Silence" (Depeche Mode cover)
12. "Head Like a Hole" (Nine Inch Nails cover)
