= Volcano (Gatsbys American Dream album) =

Studio album by Gatsbys American Dream
- Released: April 12, 2005
- Recorded: The Tank Studio
- Genre: Progressive rock Indie rock Pop punk
- Length: 33:04
- Label: Fearless
- Producer: Casey Bates and Tom Pfaeffle

Gatsbys American Dream chronology
In The Land Of Lost Monsters (2004)	Volcano (2005)	Gatsbys American Dream (2006)

Professional ratings
Review scores
Source	Rating
AbsolutePunk	(99%)
Alternative Press	5/5 stars
Punknews.org	4.5/5 stars
Acclaimed Punk	4.5/5 stars

Volcano is the third album by Gatsbys American Dream. The album is also known by the full title printed on the cover, Gatsbys American Dream and the Volcano.

After recording the album In the Land of Lost Monsters in 2004, the band began looking for a new record label. Gatsbys was approached by Fearless Records, and quickly began work on the album Volcano. Volcano was produced by Casey Bates and Tom Pfaeffle and was recorded at The Tank Studio, where In the Land of Lost Monsters was also recorded.

To date, Volcano is Gatsbys' most significant album, and, as a concept album, the most thematically focused. It revolves around the theme of humans emotions and their similarities to a volcano. Elaborating on this theme, the album explores the story of Pompeii, the ancient Roman city that was both lost to and preserved by a volcanic eruption.

The song "Theatre" is used in the EA Sports game NHL 07.

== Track listing ==
1. "Theatre" – 2:50
2. "Pompeii" – 1:53
3. "The Guilt Engine" – 2:48
4. "A Mind of Metal and Wheels" – 2:02
5. "Fable" – 2:42
6. "The Giant's Drink" – 3:13
7. "Shhhhhh! I'm Listening to Reason" – 3:53
8. "Meet Me at the Tavern in Bowerstone" – 0:28
9. "Your Only Escape" – 2:26
10. "The Hunter" – 1:49
11. "Speaker for the Dead" – 3:38
12. "The Badlands" – 2:46
13. "The Loosing of the Shadow" – 2:36

== Bonus CD track listing ==
1. "The Guilt Engine (Remix)" - 3:09
2. "Acoustic Vox" - 2:00
3. "Theater Demo" - 3:09
4. "Pompeii Demo" - 1:51
5. "Killer Clown Demo" - 2:54
6. "Shhhhhh! I'm Listening to Reason (Live)" - 3:04

The bonus CD was mailed to all who preordered the Volcano CD in 2005

=== Bobby Darling on "The Guilt Engine Remix" ===
"Guilt Engine was originally a minute longer than the remix version. It got cut and cut and cut until we got the album version. Then when we were getting close to finishing the record I threw a temper tantrum and said we had to "remix" it, and guilt engine remix is what came out. But we were too close to finishing and we didn't have the luxury of spending time with the remix to see how we felt about it after a week of listening (which is very important, because you might like something right off the bat, but not like it a week later), so we stayed with the version that made the album. Which is a lot of people's favorite track on the record, so we don't regret at all not putting the remix version on, volcano is still volcano, and it's cool to hear an alternate version of one of the songs. love you all."

== Allusions ==
- The song title "A Mind of Metal and Wheels" comes from The Lord of the Rings: The Two Towers, wherein Saruman is described as possessing "a mind of metal and wheels" by Treebeard, leader of the Ents.
- Lyrics in "Fable" are influenced by the William Golding novel Lord of the Flies.
- The song "The Giant's Drink" is loosely based on the Orson Scott Card novel Ender's Game.
- "Shhhhhh! I'm Listening to Reason" gets its title from a line in the film Pee-Wee's Big Adventure.
- "Meet Me At The Tavern In Bowerstone" is a reference to the Xbox/PC game Fable.
- Lyrics in "Your Only Escape" is highly influenced by the film Interview with a Vampire.
- The song "Speaker for the Dead" is a reference to an Orson Scott Card novel of the same name.
- Many of the lyrics from "The Badlands" are taken from The Lord of the Rings series.
- Lyrics in "The Loosing of the Shadow" are greatly inspired by Ursula K. Le Guin's novel A Wizard of Earthsea. The song shares its name with the fourth chapter of the book.

== Band members ==
- Nic Newsham - vocals
- Bobby Darling - guitars, vocals, assistant production
- Rudy Gajadhar - drums
- Kirk Huffman - bass, vocals

== Other contributors ==
- Ryan Van Wieringen - Ryan, although not a part of the band at the time, can be heard in track 12 singing "Hear you coming"
- Casey Bates - Production, Engineering, Mixing, Additional Instrumentation and Vocals
- Tom Pfaeffle - Production, Engineering, Mixing, Additional Instrumentation and Vocals
- Ed Brooks - Mastering
- Mike Kaminsky - Management
- Troy Brock - Graphic Design
- Jeremy Kirby - Graphic Design
- Adam Brock - Illustration
- Shane Tutmarc - Co-writer and vocals on "The Giant's Drink"
- Dan Young - Additional Instrumentation and Vocals
- Paul Benson - Additional Instrumentation and Vocals
- Kenny Choi - Additional Instrumentation and Vocals
- Kaylan Cloyd - Additional Instrumentation and Vocals
- Mark Gajadhar - Additional Instrumentation and Vocals
- Kyle SBL - Additional Instrumentation and Vocals
- Jeremy Kirby - Additional Instrumentation and Vocals
- Andrew DeAnda - Additional Instrumentation and Vocals
