= About a Boy =

About a Boy may refer to:

== Film and TV ==
- About a Boy (film), 2002, starring Hugh Grant, directed by brothers Chris Weitz and Paul Weitz, based on the 1998 novel
- About a Boy (soundtrack), a 2002 album by Badly Drawn Boy released as the soundtrack to the 2002 film
- About a Boy (TV series), a 2014 situation comedy on NBC, based on the 1998 novel
- "About a Boy" (Doctors), a 2004 television episode
- "About a Boy" (Homeland), a 2014 television episode

== Other media ==
- About a Boy (novel), 1998, by British writer Nick Hornby
- "About a Boy" (song), 1996, by Patti Smith, from the album Gone Again

== See also ==
- About a Girl (disambiguation)
