= Ryan Star =

American musician (born 1978)

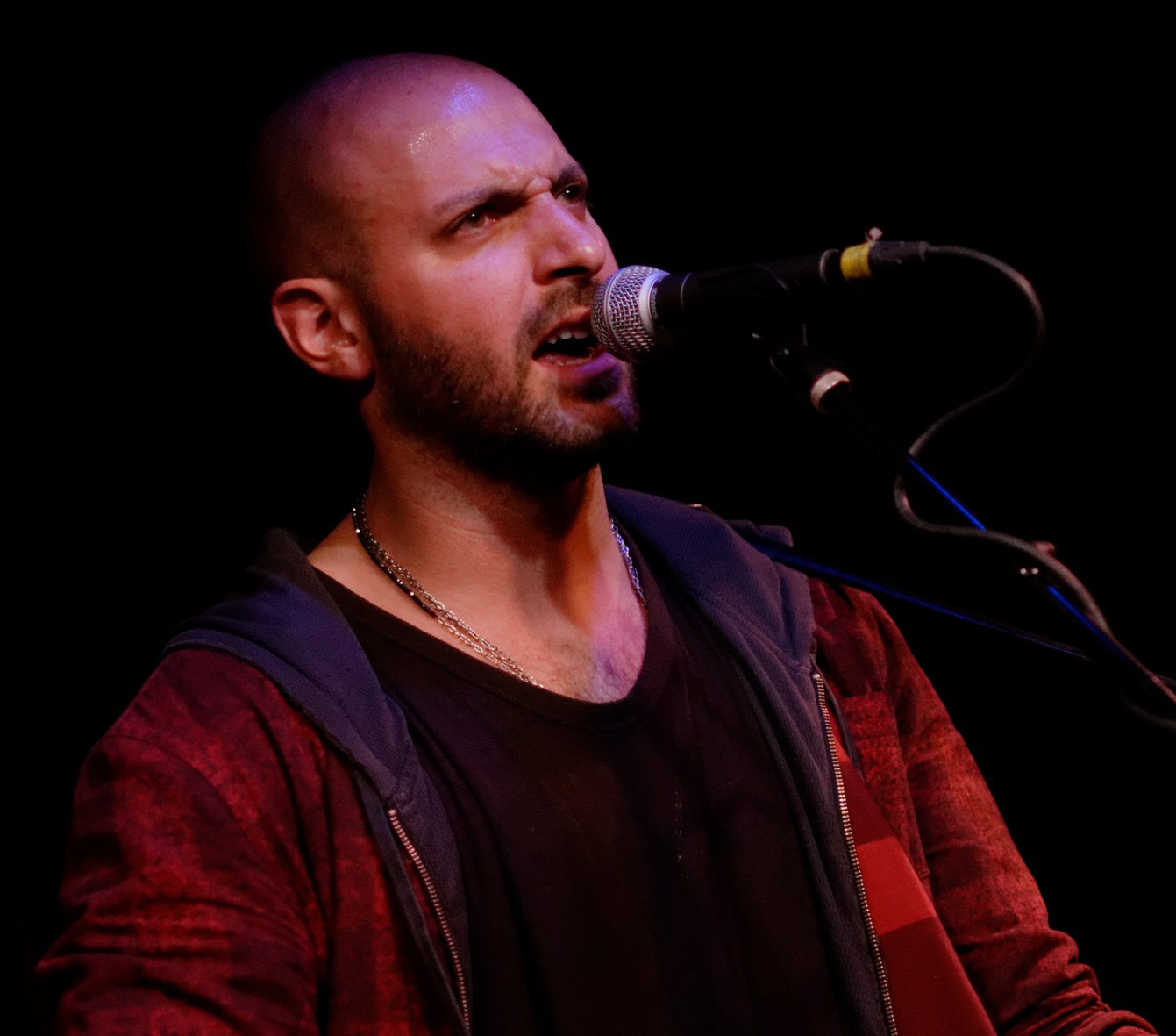
- Star performing in 2013

Background information
- Also known as: r. star, Ryan Stahr, Master K
- Born: January 7, 1978 (age 48)
- Origin: Dix Hills, New York
- Occupations: Musician, singer-songwriter
- Instruments: Vocals, guitar, piano, drums, bass guitar
- Years active: 1992–present
- Labels: Maverick, Stone Crow, Burnett, Atlantic, Island
- Website: www.rstar.net

Ryan Stahr Kulchinsky (born January 7, 1978), known professionally as Ryan Star, is an American rock singer-songwriter from Long Island, New York, currently signed on Island Records. His first major label record 11:59, released via Atlantic in 2010, reached No. 31 on Billboard 200 and No. 10 on Billboard Rock albums chart. Star became known to a wider audience as contestant on the CBS reality TV show Rock Star: Supernova in 2006. His songs have featured on several TV shows and promotion. His song "Brand New Day", featured as the main theme to Fox TV series Lie to Me, earned him a BMI TV Music Award in May 2009.

His first single for Island Records, "Stay Awhile" reached No. 28 on Billboard Adult Pop Songs, and its music video has logged over 1 million views on YouTube to date.

"Stay Awhile" was released on iTunes August 14, 2012.

== Early life ==
Star was born in Huntington, New York on Long Island, and grew up in nearby Dix Hills. He was 14 years old when he formed his first band called Stage. They released four EPs – "Black" in 1997, "Blue" in 1999, "White" in 2000 and "The Final" in 2004, and in 1995 studio album "Historical Underdosing" and a self-titled album on Maverick Records in 2003. While still in high school, the band played CBGB's and the Mercury Lounge.

When the band parted ways, Star became the solo artist R.Star and released his independently produced debut solo album Songs from the Eye of an Elephant on Stone Crow Records in 2005, some songs of Stage was re-recorded for the album (Perfect, Perfect Time Of Night (Back Of Your Car), "O", Sink Or Swim).

== Television ==
Star was a contestant on the second season of CBS' reality show Rock Star where Tommy Lee's band Supernova was looking for a lead singer to front the supergroup. On the show, Ryan consistently showed his diverse style from melodic and moving piano to rocking, and was nicknamed Ryan "The Darkhorse" Star by show commentator Dave Navarro. He was eventually eliminated, and days later, Mark Burnett, the show's producer, set up Ryan and the show's House Band to record a live album, to help Ryan jump start his career. He returned to the show on week 11 with the help of his fans through SMS voting, to perform an encore performance of "Back of Your Car", and was awarded a Honda CR-V.

Ryan Star appeared on the Rachael Ray show and performed "Breathe" and "Start a Fire" (aired October 6, 2010).

Ryan Star appeared on the Tonight Show with Jay Leno and performed "Stay Awhile" (aired August 14, 2012)

Ryan Star and band performed "Stay Awhile" on VH1 Big Morning Buzz (aired September 7, 2012)

== Career ==
Atlantic Records released Last Train Home EP on June 16, 2009, of four songs to appear on Star's album.

The music video for "Breathe", premiered on CNN.com October 21, 2009, highlighted 18 unemployed people in various occupations and the website Ryan Star established breathe4jobs.com to allow potential employers to contact those appearing in the video. VH-1 interviewed Ryan Star on its VH-1 Top 20 show where he spoke of the positive effects of the video for his song "Breathe." One of the people in the video successfully found a job because of the video.

Star's first major label studio album, titled 11:59, was released on August 3, 2010, with a sold-out performance that night at New York City's famed Irving Plaza. The album debuted at No. 10 on the Billboard Rock Albums chart, and at No. 31 on Billboard.com.

Ryan Star released a free EP to his fans in January 2012, titled The America EP via Twitter and Facebook. The songs "Orphans" and "Somebody's Son" were initially meant to be released on 11:59. The EP is dedicated to Star's grandfather who fought in World War II.

As Atlantic showed no interest to support his new song, Ryan Star recorded and self-released a music video for "Stay Awhile" in February 2012, getting attention from MTV Buzzworthy as a breakthrough hit. The video has reached over 1 million views on YouTube as of August 2012. The song also charted on Hot AC and Adult Pop Songs charts based on radioplay. Eventually, on August 6, 2012, Star and his management announced via Twitter that he had signed on with a new record label Island Records. Ryan Star said that he made his decision after consulting with Jon Bon Jovi, whose band has been on Island for 30 years. The label's reaction to his song meant a lot to him as well.

His single "Stay Awhile" was released via Island Records August 14, 2012. Ryan and his band made their late night television debut on The Tonight Show with Jay Leno on the same day.

Star will release a 5-song EP Animals, recorded with his touring band in Rhinebeck, New York, on August 5, 2013. The single from the EP, "Impossible" is currently streaming exclusively at Billboard.com.

== Touring ==
Ryan has been on the road in support of "Stay Awhile". Recently opening for Andy Grammer, Ryan has previously toured with Parlotones, Bon Jovi, Train, The Script, Rob Thomas, Collective Soul, O.A.R. and David Cook.

Star opened for Bon Jovi on three dates of their Bon Jovi Live tour in March 2011, and for the Goo Goo Dolls during the October–November 2011 stretch of their Something for the Rest of Us Tour.

== Songwriting ==
"Last Train Home" was featured on the soundtrack for the movie P.S. I Love You (premiered December 21, 2007)
"This Could Be The Year" was featured on the WWE Survivor Series (aired November 23, 2008)
"Losing Your Memory" was featured on the episode 2x13 "Daddy Issues" of the Vampire Diaries (aired February 3, 2011)
"Brand New Day" was the theme song for the TV series Lie to Me (aired January 21, 2009 – January 31, 2011)
Besides his own music, Ryan Star has songwriting credits on other artists' releases, such as:

- We are Unbreakable – Hedley
- My Oh My – Tristan Prettyman
- Screaming – James Durbin
- Don't Stop – Electric Touch
- Right Here With You – David Cook
- A Perfect World – Takida

== Discography ==
=== Studio albums ===
Year	Album	Peak chart positions	
Year	Album	US	US Rock
2005	Songs from the Eye of an Elephant: Released: 2005	—	—
2006	Dark Horse – A Live Collection: Released: 2006	—	—
2010	11:59: Released: August 3, 2010	31	10
2014	Angels + Animals: Released: January 13, 2014	—	—
2015	After the Elephant: Released: TBA	—	—
"—" denotes the album did not chart.

=== EPs ===
Year	Album	Peak chart positions		
Year	Album	US Heat	US	US Rock
2009	Last Train Home EP: Released: June 16, 2009; Label: Atlantic	42	—	—
2012	The America EP: Released: January 13, 2012; Label: self-released	—	—	—
2013	Animals: Released: August 5, 2013; Label: self-released	—	—	—
"—" denotes the album did not chart.

=== Singles ===
Year	Single	Peak chart positions		Album
Year	Single	US Adult Top40	US Hot Dance	Album
2009	"Last Train Home": Released: February 3, 2009	—	—	11:59
2009	"Breathe": Released: August 3, 2009	15	41	11:59
2010	"Start a Fire": Released: September 14, 2010	17	—	11:59
2012	"Stay Awhile": Released: August 14, 2012	28	—	Non-album single
2013	"Impossible": Released: July 23, 2013	—	—	Angels + Animals
2017	"Don't Give Up": Released: July 25, 2017	—	—	Non-album single
"—" denotes the single did not chart.

=== Music videos ===
Year	Video	Album
2008	"Right Now"	Last Train Home EP
2009	"Last Train Home"	Last Train Home EP
2009	"Breathe"	11:59
2010	"Start a Fire"	11:59
2012	"Stay Awhile"	

=== Other appearances ===
These songs have been released on albums that were not a studio album released by Star.

Year	Song	Album
2007	"Last Train Home"	P.S. I Love You Soundtrack
2009	"Brand New Day"	Lie to Me Soundtrack

On December 3, 2010, Ryan Star performed for the 101.9 FM Miracle on State Street in Chicago Illinois, along with Ingrid Michaelson, and Maroon 5.

== Songs in other media ==
Year	Title	Type	Song
2008	Survivor Series (2008)	TV pay-per-view special theme song	"This Could Be The Year"
2009	CCTV5 News Show: Total Soccer	TV new program closing credits	"Brand New Day"
2009	Lie to Me	TV series theme song	"Brand New Day"
2009	Major League Baseball	TV sports program: 2009 Playoffs	"Breathe"
2009	One Life to Live	TV series episode: "No One Ever Said It Would Be This Hard"	"We Might Fall"
2009	The Philanthropist	TV series promos	"Right Now"
2010	All My Children	Episode airing July 28, 2010	"Breathe"
2010	The Biggest Loser: Pay It Forward	TV series: Week 10	"Breathe"
2011	The Vampire Diaries	Episode 2–13 "Daddy Issues" airing March 2, 2011	"Losing Your Memory"
2011	The Amazing Race: Unfinished Business	TV series promos	"This Could Be The Year"
