= Start a Fire (Ryan Star song) =

Single by Ryan Star

from the album 11:59
- Released: September 14, 2010
- Genre: Dance-rock
- Length: 3:21
- Label: Atlantic
- Songwriter(s): Star, Ido Zmishlany

Ryan Star singles chronology
"Breathe" (2010)	"Start a Fire" (2010)	"Stay Awhile" (2012)

Start a Fire is the second single from Ryan Star's debut album 11:59. It debuted at #36 on the Adult Pop Songs chart and peaked at #17.

== Charts ==
Chart (2010)	Peak position
US Adult Pop Songs (Billboard)	17
