= Gatsbys American Dream (album) =

Studio album by Gatsbys American Dream
- Released: August 8, 2006
- Recorded: c.2006
- Genres: Progressive rock indie rock pop punk
- Length: 33:43
- Label: Fearless
- Producers: Bobby Darling and Casey Bates

Gatsbys American Dream chronology
Volcano (2005)	Gatsbys American Dream (2006)

Professional ratings
Review scores
Source	Rating
AbsolutePunk.net	(95%)
AllMusic	4/5 stars
Punknews.org	4/5 stars
Mammoth Press	(7.5/10)

Gatsbys American Dream is the self-titled fourth album from Gatsbys American Dream. It is the band's second album released under Fearless Records and their fourth full-length overall. It is also the first album with band member Kyle O'Quin.

== Track listing ==
No.	Title	Length
1.	"You All Everybody"	3:13
2.	"We Can Remember It for You Wholesale"	3:42
3.	"Badd Beat"	3:13
4.	"My Name Is Ozymandias"	3:21
5.	"Margaritas and Cock"	3:05
6.	"Station 5: The Pearl"	2:49
7.	"Shadow of the Colossus"	3:02
8.	"Filthy Beasts"	2:36
9.	"Looks Like the Real Thing"	2:36
10.	"Me and Ed Loyce"	2:54
11.	"The White Mountains"	3:09

== Track title references ==
- "You All Everybody" is the title of a song by Charlie Pace's band "Driveshaft" on the TV show Lost. Aside from the title, this song and the one on the show bear no similarities.
- "We Can Remember It For You Wholesale" is the title of a science fiction novelette written by Philip K. Dick upon which the film Total Recall was based.
- "My Name Is Ozymandias" comes from a line of the sonnet titled "Ozymandias" by poet Percy Bysshe Shelley. It is also a reference to the character Ozymandias in John Christopher's The Tripods trilogy.
- "Margaritas and Cock" is a line from the movie The Matador. Pierce Brosnan's character Julian Noble says the line "Margaritas and cock" in reference to "things that taste better in Mexico." The song is about bullfighting.
- "Station 5: The Pearl" refers to the name of one of the Dharma Initiative's research stations on the TV show Lost.
- "Shadow of the Colossus" is the name of a video game for the PlayStation 2.
- "Me and Ed Loyce" is in reference to a Philip K. Dick short story called The Hanging Stranger in which the main character's name is Ed Loyce.
- "The White Mountains" is the title of the first novel in The Tripods trilogy by science fiction writer John Christopher.
- "Filthy Beasts" contains a reading of the lyrics of NOFX's "It's My Job To Keep Punk Rock Elite" from their album So Long and Thanks for All the Shoes.

== Band members ==
- Nic Newsham - vocals
- Bobby Darling - guitar, vocals
- Rudy Gajadhar - drums
- Kirk Huffman - bass, vocals
- Ryan Van Wieringen - guitar (did not take part in this album)
- Kyle O'Quin - keyboards
