= Last Train Home EP =

Last Train Home

EP by Ryan Star
- Released: June 16, 2009
- Genre: Rock
- Length: 14:23
- Label: r.star, Atlantic
- Producer: Matt Serletic

Ryan Star chronology
| Dark Horse – A Live Collection (2006) | Last Train Home (2009) | 11:59 (2010) |

Last Train Home EP is an EP by singer/songwriter Ryan Star including four previously unreleased songs and two music videos. It reached No. 42 on Top Heatseekers chart. The title song was released as the first single off Star's major label debut 11:59. It was also featured on the soundtrack for the film P.S. I Love You (2007).

All songs were originally waiting to be released on 11:59, while the album release date kept being pushed back, from 'late 2008' eventually to August 2010. “I wanted to make sure the fans had some music because they have been waiting a long time,” Star told Alternative Addiction about the reason for releasing the EP. "[..] just to have something out there right now."

All tracks on the EP included songs that had been on TV and movies. "Brand New Day" was the main theme song for the FOX TV show Lie to Me. "This Could Be the Year" was used on Super Bowl promo spots in 2009, as well as the theme song for WWE pay-per-view event Survivor Series 2008. "Right Now" was picked up for promos for "The Philanthropist" on NBC, and it has also been used by ESPN.

== Track listing ==
1. "Last Train Home" (4:14)
2. "Brand New Day" (3:13)
3. "Right Now" (3:38)
4. "This Could Be The Year" (3:18)
5. "Last Train Home" (video)
6. "Right Now" (video)

== Single release ==
The "Last Train Home" single was released on iTunes on February 3, 2009, preceding a tentative album release in May 2009. However, the album was pushed back, and the EP was released instead. The single didn't chart on Billboard and Mediabase at this time. Music video for the song, directed by Ray Kay, premiered March 5, 2009 on Ryan Star's website.

Track listing:

1. Last Train Home (4:15)
2. Right Now (3:38)
