= About a Girl (The Academy Is... song) =

Single by The Academy Is...

from the album Fast Times at Barrington High
- Released: July 15, 2008
- Recorded: 2008
- Genre: Alternative rock; power pop
- Length: 3:30
- Label: Fueled by Ramen; Decaydance
- Songwriters: William Beckett; Mike Carden; Michael Guy Chislett; Andy Mrotek; Dave Katz; Sam Hollander

The Academy Is... singles chronology
"Same Blood" (2007)	"About a Girl" (2008)	"Summer Hair = Forever Young" (2008)

"About a Girl" is a song performed by American rock band the Academy Is... from their third studio album, Fast Times at Barrington High. The single reached the pop charts at number 88, making it the band's first charting single. "About a Girl" was ranked number 74 on MTV's Latin American list of the Top 100 Hits of 2008. The song was number 39 on Rolling Stone's list of the 100 Best Songs of 2008. The song impacted radio on August 12, 2008.

== Music video ==
The video for the single revolves around William Beckett and his bandmates in high school. Beckett has it made; he has the girl, the friends and the popularity. However, this turns out to just be a daydream; his sole friends at school are his bandmates and the girl (played by American model Brittany Moser) is in a relationship with a jock football player. Throughout the course of the video, Beckett dreams of having the girl until finally, they embrace and drive off in what appears to be another one of his daydreams. However, this daydream is revealed to be that of the girl's, longing for Beckett though trapped in a relationship with another guy (played by American male model James Ellis). Beckett and she exchange eye contact, creating a possible future for the two.

== Charts ==
Chart (2009)	Peak position
U.S. Billboard Pop 100	88

== Certifications ==
Region	Certification	Certified units/sales
United States (RIAA)	Gold	500,000^{‡}
^{‡} Sales+streaming figures based on certification alone.

== Release history ==
Release dates and formats for "About a Girl"
Region	Date	Format	Label(s)	Ref.
United States	October 21, 2008	Mainstream airplay	Fueled By Ramen	
