= Gatsbys American Dream =

American indie rock band

- Origin: Seattle, Washington, U.S.
- Genres: Indie rock
- Years active: 2001–2006; 2010–2012; 2020–present
- Labels: Rocketstar; LLR; Fearless; Equal Vision
- Members: Nic Newsham; Kirk Huffman; Rudy Gajadhar; Ryan Van Wieringen
- Past members: Bobby Darling; Kyle O'Quin; Dustin McGhye; Joey Atkins; Josh Berg
- Website: Official Site

Gatsbys American Dream is an American indie rock band from Seattle, Washington. Since their founding in 2001, they have released four full-length albums and one EP. The band's self-titled fourth album, their second released with Fearless Records, peaked at number 22 on Billboard's Top Heatseekers chart and number 28 on the Top Independent Albums chart. The band drew their name from F. Scott Fitzgerald's novel The Great Gatsby.

== Origins and Why We Fight ==
The prototypes for the songs on the band's first record, Why We Fight, were (according to Bobby) written by his earlier band, One Point Two, on Together Records (Killed For Less Records) out of Richmond, Indiana. Scott George, owner of Together Records/Killed For Less Records, had said the band was ahead of its time and groundbreaking. This band was made up of Bobby Darling, Casey Bates, Josh Berg, and Dustin McGhie. The group later met up with the former guitarist and singer of Good for Nothing, Nic Newsham and Ryan Van Wieringen, and formed Gatsbys American Dream. Although Casey Bates never joined the band, he has remained their producer throughout the band's career.

When Acceptance guitarist Kaylan Cloyd heard a Gatsbys demo, he handed it to Darrick Bourgeois, owner of local record label Rocketstar Recordings. Shortly afterward, Gatsbys signed a two-record deal with Rocketstar and worked with producer Aaron Sprinkle to record their 2002 debut album Why We Fight.

Shortly after the release of their first album, the line-up changed when bassist Josh Berg left and Kirk Huffman (formerly of K Through Six) was recruited. He is often recognized as the only bassist because Berg never toured with the band. After the band's first tour, Dustin McGhie also left and the band found Rudy Gajadhar, formerly of Waxwing and Bugs in Amber.

== Ribbons and Sugar ==
In 2003, the band released their second record, Ribbons and Sugar, a concept album based loosely on George Orwell’s fable Animal Farm. Musically, the album found them exploring a harder-edged pop sound, opting for unusual time signatures and tempo changes. Although literary references are common through most of their material, Ribbons and Sugar also began a motif of record label disdain. The lyrics of "Cut the Strings" read:

"This is awful to think who decides what should or should not stay, what ends up on the cutting room floor. Apparently it's not my choice to make."

== In the Land of Lost Monsters ==
Gatsbys' two-record deal with Rocketstar was fulfilled with Ribbons and Sugar, and the band decided not to renew their contract. Later, guitarist Ryan Van Wieringen would leave the band to further his college education.

Following the release of Ribbons and Sugar, the band did a showcase with Drive Thru Records. Slightly embittered by the process, the band signed a one-record deal with Chicago-based LLR Recordings in 2004. Their contractual record, the more mellow and subdued In the Land of Lost Monsters EP, was in part a response to the post-Ribbons record label attention the band had received. Labels that approached them wanted the band to write choruses for their next record (a standard songwriting technique the band had, up to that point, seemed to avoid). Newsham and Darling's lyrics for Lost Monsters reflected this struggle, criticizing the music industry and expressing the band's wariness of record labels, although this was not the only theme of the album. In addition, many of the literary allusions on this EP centered on A Wizard of Earthsea by Ursula K. Le Guin as seen by the songs The Dragon of Pendor and The Loosing of the Shadow, although Darling has denied that the lyrics of "The Dragon of Pendor" were about the Le Guin book in particular.

== Volcano ==
Several months after the EP's release, the band settled on Fearless Records and released their third full-length, Volcano, in April 2005. Thematically, Volcano revolves around Pompeii (as evidenced by the title of the second track on the record), which stands as a metaphor for the uncontrollable intensity of human emotion. The album is rife with literary and cultural references from such diverse works as children's film Pee-wee's Big Adventure, Lionhead Studio's Fable, William Golding's Lord of the Flies, Tolkien's The Lord of the Rings, the action film Jurassic Park, and Orson Scott Card's science-fiction epics Ender's Game and Speaker for the Dead.

During the tour that followed the release of Volcano, Gatsbys added Kyle O'Quin (also a member of the band Surrounded By Lions). A few months after O'Quin was added to the band, Ryan Van Wieringen met up with the band in Arizona while they were on tour there and rejoined the line up. Since then, he has been touring and performing live as part of the band.

== Self-titled album and hiatus ==
Gatsbys' self-titled fourth full-length album was released August 8, 2006. The album is peppered with numerous pop culture and literary references, which appear in both the lyrics and song titles, ranging from works by Philip K. Dick to the television show Lost.

The band has been relatively inactive since the release of the self-titled album. The band has played a handful of shows in and around the Seattle area, and on April 27, 2007, they played their first out-of-state show since the self-titled album's release at Colgate University. In a forum post at Gatsbys fansite Snicker at the Swine, Bobby stated the following in regards to future albums or tours:

If I find I have more to say with Gatsbys I will write more music. We're not gonna just play to play. The only way I'll do more Gatsbys is if we are making new music. Which I am totally open to. I really have been working on new Gatsbys music. I'll probably lay down some demo shit the next time I'm at Casey's.

During the hiatus, most of the members started side projects.

== First Reunion ==
In September 2010, at Forgive Durden's "Return to Wonderland" show at El Corazon in Seattle, which included Places and Numbers (Bobby Darling with all members except Newsham as a backing band), and Princess Dinosaur (Nic Newsham). The show concluded with all of the members of Gatsbys American Dream going on stage after Places and Numbers and playing "Theatre" off of Volcano.

On October 5, 2010, entirely through newly created Facebook/Twitter accounts, the band announced they were officially reuniting. They also hinted towards the album they began recording by uploading pictures and mentioning Casey Bates' studio. The band also asked fans to contact their booking agent and request cities for a future tour. Gatsby noted that side projects Kay Kay and His Weathered Underground and Wild Orchid Children in particular would not be affected by the reunion.

In January 2011 the band worked with the Overdue Collection Agency, a record label dedicated to remastering vinyl records and sending the profits to a charity of the band's choice. They re-released their first two albums, Why We Fight and Ribbons & Sugar on vinyl, with the label, with the goal of raising $5,500 for water.org. They exceeded their goal well before the due date and planned to release their first EP, In the Land of Lost Monsters, later.

On March 4, 2011, the band unveiled new material, with a song titled "Modern Man" on their new official website. In order to hear it, fans have to play a game similar to Angry Birds. On March 11, a second song, initially named "Born Dead", was to be streamed, but it was delayed and renamed "Untitled" after the 2011 Yunnan earthquake. The song was released a few days after the event, under the name "Untitled". From this point the band went inactive, with no official statements or releases for over two years. On March 12, 2013, Nic Newsham announced via Twitter that the planned reunion album was still incomplete, and would probably never be released. The band, however, released Modern Man and Untitled on vinyl in 2020.

== Second Reunion ==
On January 24 2023, the band announced that they were re-uniting as a four piece and would again start playing live shows.

The band released new music, a three-song EP named Chyron, in October 2025.

== Members ==
- Nic Newsham – vocals
- Ryan Van Wieringen – guitar, vocals (appears on Why We Fight and Ribbons and Sugar; left for college after sophomore CD and returned to tour after the release of the self-titled)
- Kirk Huffman – bass, vocals
- Rudy Gajadhar – drums and percussion

=== Former members ===
- Bobby Darling – guitar, vocals (Darling blessed the Gatsbys reunion in 2023, yet declined to take part)
- Kyle O'Quin – keyboard, vocals
- Dustin McGhye – drums (on Why We Fight)
- Josh Berg – bass (on Why We Fight)

== Discography ==
=== Albums ===
- Why We Fight (Rocketstar, 2002)
- Ribbons and Sugar (Rocketstar, 2003)
- Volcano (Fearless, 2005)
- Gatsbys American Dream (Fearless, 2006)

=== Singles and EPs ===
- In the Land of Lost Monsters (LLR, 2004)
- Volcano Bonus Disc (Fearless, 2005)
- Modern Man (Equal Vision, 2020)
- Chyron (Adventure Cat, 2025)

=== Compilations ===
- A Santa Cause: It's a Punk Rock Christmas (Immortal, 2003) - "Christmas Time Is Here"
- In Honor: A Compilation to Beat Cancer (Vagrant Records, 2004) - "The Rundown"
- Punk Goes 80's (Fearless, 2005) - "Just Like Heaven"
- Warped Tour 2005 Compilation (SideOneDummy, 2005) - "Theatre"
- Music on the Brain Vol. 2 (Smartpunk, 2005) - "Theatre"
- Taste of Christmas (Warcon, 2005) - "Saint Nicholas"
- Music on the Brain Vol. 3 (Smartpunk, 2006) - "Station 5: The Pearl"
- Paupers, Peasants, Princes & Kings: The Songs of Bob Dylan (Doghouse Records, 2006) - "Don't Think Twice, It's All Right"
- NHL07 (EA Sports, 2006) - "Theatre"
- Equal Vision Summer Sample 2011 - "Modern Man"

=== A Year in the Gulch ===
A Year in the Gulch was released in 2003. It contains footage by Casey Bates, Eric Slagle, and the band. It was produced, edited, and designed by Casey Bates. The video contains three music videos including the Ribbons and Sugar CD release party, touring and recording featurettes, over 150 photos, personal member videos, behind the scenes footage of a year with the band when they were recording and touring in support of Ribbons and Sugar.

== Side projects ==
The following bands were started during Gatsbys's unofficial hiatus. Of all the Gatsbys members, Rudy Gajadhar is the only one with no other known projects, though he played drums with Search/Rescue at a June 2007 show in Seattle and recorded drums for Forgive Durden's album, Razia's Shadow.

=== Kay Kay and His Weathered Underground ===
Kay Kay and His Weathered Underground is an indie band started by Kirk Huffman and Kyle O'Quin. Like Gatsbys, the band is influenced by a wide variety of musical genres. Though the band only has three official members, they have been known to perform with as many as 11 additional musicians on stage.

=== Search/Rescue ===
Search/Rescue is a progressive rock band formed by members of Gatsbys American Dream and Acceptance. The band independently released their debut album, titled The Compound, in 2008.

=== RedRedBlue ===
RedRedBlue was Newsham's powerpop side project with Justin Harcus of Pale Pacific. The band's name was taken from a Gatsbys song from In the Land of Lost Monsters, which was often thought to be a reference to an army's color code from the book Ender's Game by Orson Scott Card (Newsham has said this was just a coincidence). To date, the band has released 3 tracks for download on their MySpace page. On August 23, Newsham posted a MySpace bulletin stating that due to popular request, he would start writing more songs for RedRedBlue, but that they would likely be acoustic-only.

==== Members ====
- Nic Newsham - vocals, guitar
- Justin Harcus - bass

=== Wild Orchid Children ===
Wild Orchid Children is another band featuring Huffman and O'Quin. In August 2007, the band started a MySpace page and posted a single song, titled "Ahead of Us the Secret" which was also made available for free download at Gatsbys fansite Snicker At The Swine. The band features musicians from other prominent Seattle bands The Divorce and Forgive Durden.

The band started taking pre-orders in late October 2007 for a 4-song EP, which includes the songs released for streaming on the band's Myspace page. After a manufacturing error caused delays in the release of the EP, the band started shipping orders in January 2008. The EP's artwork is by John Gourley.

Wild Orchid Children signed to Equal Vision Records in the summer of 2010, The Wild Orchid Children Are Alexander Supertramp was subsequently released on Tuesday, November 9, 2010. The album features all four tracks from the previous EP, re-recorded with extended sections and additional instrumentation.

==== Members ====
- Kirk Huffman - vocals
- Kyle O'Quin - keys
- Thomas Hunter - guitar
- Andy Lum - drums
- Aaron Benson - percussion
- Ryan Van Wieringen - baritone guitar & percussion
- Scot Porter - percussion & effects
- Garrett Lunceford (drums on Elephant EP)

=== Bombs Over Bellevue ===
Bombs Over Bellevue is an independent label started by Huffman.

To date, the label's only release is the live Kay Kay and His Weathered Underground DVD/CD Live at the Pretty Parlor. The label's website stated that a 5-song EP by Seattle band Man in the Blue Van will be released toward the end of the year as well as a 10" vinyl-only release from Huffman's Wild Orchid Children.

=== Marrakesh ===
Marrakesh is an alternative/grunge band started by James Hill, Kyle O’Quin, Andy Lum, and Ryan Van Wieringen in 2008 and was active until 2010. Marrakesh released a self-titled EP as well as a two-sided single consisting of the songs “Jeep Man” and “Mendips”.

- Ryan Van Wieringen - guitar, vocals
- Andy Lum - keys
- Kyle O'Quin - bass
- James Hill - vocals, guitar
- Brock Lowry - drums

=== Keith Ledger ===
Keith Ledger is a punk band featuring Nic Newsham on vocals. So far, the band has released four tracks for streaming on their Myspace page and played a handful of shows in the Seattle area.

==== Members ====
- Nic Newsham - vocals/guitar
- Ryan Short
- Jonathan Driscoll

=== Zero Cool ===
Zero Cool is a rock band featuring Bobby Darling and Thomas Dutton of Forgive Durden. The band came out of an idea both members had about mapping out an entire album using guidelines for the tempo and key and setting up the session in ProTools before playing a single note. Currently, the band has only released a single song titled "Godzilla" on Forgive Durden's blog.

==== Members ====
- Bobby Darling - guitar, bass, vocals
- Thomas Dutton - drums, vocals

=== Razia's Shadow ===
Forgive Durden's "Razia's Shadow" is a musical involving several artists in the Seattle indie scene. The album features Nic as King Malka in the song "Meet the King", and Rudy playing the drums throughout the album.

=== Princess Dinosaur ===
Princess Dinosaur is a side project started by Nick Vombrack (formerly of Dr Manhattan) with help from Nic Newsham. They currently have three songs on their Myspace page. They released a six-song EP titled "A Goldfish and his Friends" for one "Like" on Facebook

Band Members:

- Guitars, Drums: Nick Vombrack
- Vocals, Lyrics: Nic Newsham

=== Places and Numbers ===
Bobby Darling has recorded new material under the moniker Places and Numbers with the help of friend/producer Casey Bates, using an iBook and a Macbook Pro while they traveled around Europe. Places and Numbers signed to Equal Vision Records in early 2010 and released their debut EP, Waking The Dead, on a pay what you can model through Bandcamp.com. A full-length album titled Travels is expected later in 2010.

=== Ticktockman ===
Ticktockman is an alternative band featuring Andy Lum and Ryan Van Wieringen. They released their first EP, Periscope, for sale on iTunes on February 3, 2010. It is also up for download on the pay what you can website Bandcamp.com.

The band released their first full-length record Ticktockman on February 14, 2012. It features 11 original tracks recorded with producer Derek Moree.

An as yet untitled second EP is expected from the band some time in 2012.

Members

- Ryan Van Wieringen - vocals
- Andy Lum - guitar
- Morgan 'Boon' Bruner - guitar
- Phil Sells - bass
- Brock Lowry - drums

=== Kyle O'Quin's solo project ===
Keyboard player Kyle O'Quin announced on March 11 via snickerattheswine.com that he had recorded a solo album and would be touring with the Seattle-based band Lets Get Lost serving as a backing band.

=== The Money Pit ===
(July 10, 2015) Seattle-based indie rock vets Bobby Darling and Nic Newsham (formerly of Gatsby’s American Dream) have recently revealed their new post-punk collaboration, The Money Pit, and are set to release their self-titled debut on September 4. Produced by Casey Bates (Portugal. The Man, Pierce the Veil), the record evokes the garage rock sound of early The Strokes and Arctic Monkeys, while retaining signature elements that Gatsby’s longtime fans will recognize.
