= 11:59 (album) =

Studio album by Ryan Star
- Released: August 3, 2010
- Recorded: 2006–2010 Calabasas, California
- Genre: Alternative rock, post-grunge
- Length: 36:29; 59:57 (iTunes Deluxe Edition)
- Label: Atlantic
- Producer: Matt Serletic, Howard Benson

Ryan Star chronology
Last Train Home EP (2009)	11:59 (2010)	The America EP (2012)

Singles from 11:59
- 1. "Last Train Home" Released: February 3, 2009; 2. "Breathe" Released: August 4, 2009; 3. "Start a Fire" Released: September 14, 2010

11:59 is the second studio album by American rock singer-songwriter Ryan Star. The album debuted at No. 31 on the Billboard 200 after selling nearly 11,600 copies on its first week, making his highest chart debut on Billboard 200.

== Track listing ==
All tracks produced by Matt Serletic, except for "Breathe" and "Start a Fire" produced by Howard Benson.

Standard edition
No.	Title	Writer(s)	Length
1.	"Brand New Day"	Ryan Star, Max Collins	3:14
2.	"Right Now"	Star, Collins, Matthew Bair, Matt Serletic	3:39
3.	"Last Train Home"	Star, Collins, Serletic	4:14
4.	"Breathe"	Star, Collins	3:49
5.	"We Might Fall"	Star	3:06
6.	"This Could Be the Year"	Star, Collins	3:16
7.	"Unbreak"	Star, Kevin Kadish, Lindy Robbins	3:47
8.	"Start a Fire"	Star, Ido Zmishlany	3:20
9.	"Losing Your Memory"	Star, Collins	4:45
10.	"11:59"	Star, Collins	3:19

An exclusive deluxe iTunes version of the album includes additional three bonus tracks, three music videos, and a digital booklet.

iTunes Deluxe Edition
No.	Title	Writer(s)	Length
11.	"You and Me" (iTunes Bonus Track)	Star, Collins, Raine Maida	3:23
12.	"Gonna Make It Right" (iTunes Bonus Track)	Star, Collins	4:24
13.	"Back of Your Car" (iTunes Bonus Track)	Star	3:35
14.	"Right Now" (Music Video)		4:05
15.	"Breathe" (Music Video)		4:03
16.	"Last Train Home" (Music Video)		3:58

== Reception ==
=== Critical response ===
The album has received generally favorable reviews from music critics.

Billboard states that "the singer's voice throughout the set has a rocker-gruff quality that often stretches into melodic overtones as displayed on the track "This Could Be The Year"." Star is also complimented on "Losing Your Memory", for giving "an impressive delivery on the emotional track, belting about the loss of his place in loved one's heart." (favorable)

Jon Regen for Keyboard Magazine notes how "Star surrounds himself with a cast of keyboard killers including Serletic, Kim Bullard, and Patrick Warren, who bathe his soaring pop choruses in an ever-evolving sonic glow". (favorable)

Melodic.net gave the album 4 stars (out of five), and said: "It is a fitting end to one of the most complete albums of the year thus far. Ryan Star deserves a chance. This might just be his."

Stephen Thomas Erlewine from Allmusic gave the album 3 stars (out of five), "11:59 is the kind of slick, splashy debut designed to launch a career that has no ties to television. Thing of it is, it’s so cleanly commercial that it could use an outside boost, something to lend this collection of atmospheric anthems, passionate pleading, manicured rocking, and snappy AAA pop a bit of a defining personality."

Tunelab gave the album 8.5 stars out of 10, "Every instrumental on "11:59" is great, and every bit of vocal passion that emerges from Star is fantastic. The man sings as though he really feels what he is singing and he has the range to back it up. Despite only ten tracks being present on the album, each is memorable and unique to the rest of the set. The biggest faults the album has are minor. It is awfully short, especially considering how long it took to release, and the album doesn't really have much of a flow. Each track is so different than the others, it feels more like a mixtape than an album, though a very good mixtape."

Some of music critics gave the album very negative reviews.

Rolling Stone gave the album 2 stars (out of five), "Ryan Star returns with a much-delayed major-label debut album filled with second-rate pop rock and a formula he beats senseless: He takes his brooding rasp from a muttered whisper to an overwrought rock howl about nine times too many."

=== Chart performance ===
The album debuted at No. 31 on the Billboard 200 and No. 10 on Billboard Rock Albums chart, and made it to No. 4 on Billboard Tastemaker Albums chart, with 11,599 copies sold on its first week of release.

Chart (2009–2010)	Peak position
U.S. Billboard 200	31
U.S. Rock Albums	10

== Uses in media ==
- "Breathe" named as "iTunes Single of the Week". and has also been featured in recent promotional spots for such popular TV series as Fox's American Idol and So You Think You Can Dance, NBC's The Biggest Loser, ABC's All My Children, and WWE's annual Tribute "To The Troops".
- "Last Train Home" has been featured in ABC's General Hospital, and featured on the soundtrack album P.S. I Love You
- "Brand New Day" featured as the theme song for the Fox series Lie to Me.
- "This Could Be The Year" can be heard on WWE television's Survivor Series.
- "Losing Your Memory" was featured on the television series The Vampire Diaries in the episode "Daddy Issues".
