= The Pioneer Sessions =

Compilation album by William Beckett
- Released: January 22, 2013
- Genre: Pop rock
- Length: 41:06
- Label: YIKE Records

William Beckett chronology
What Will Be EP (2012)	The Pioneer Sessions (2013)	Genuine & Counterfeit (2013)

The Pioneer Sessions is a compilation album by William Beckett containing acoustic versions of songs from his previous three EPs. It was released on January 22, 2013, under YIKE Records.

== Track listing ==
All tracks are written by William Beckett.

No.	Title	Original release	Length
1.	"Compromising Me"	Walk the Talk	3:27
2.	"Girl, You Shoulda Been a Drummer"	Walk the Talk	3:25
3.	"Oh, Love!"	Walk the Talk	3:42
4.	"You Never Give Up"	Walk the Talk	3:22
5.	"Great Night"	Winds Will Change	3:02
6.	"Warriors"	Winds Will Change	3:04
7.	"Scarlet (Tokyo)"	Winds Will Change	3:20
8.	"Dig a Hole"	Winds Will Change	4:07
9.	"Stuck in Love"	What Will Be	2:52
10.	"Slip Away"	What Will Be	3:25
11.	"Dear Life"	What Will Be	3:43
12.	"Our Story's Already Been Told"	What Will Be	3:37
Total length:			41:06
