= From the Carpet =

EP by The Academy Is...
- Released: February 21, 2006
- Recorded: The Gallery of Carpet (Villa Park, Illinois)
- Genre: Acoustic
- Length: 21:17
- Label: Fueled by Ramen

The Academy Is... chronology
Almost Here (2005)	From the Carpet (2006)	Santi (2007)

Professional ratings
Review scores
Source	Rating
AbsolutePunk	(73%)

From the Carpet is an acoustic EP by The Academy Is..., released as a digital-only release on February 21, 2006. It included three songs from Almost Here: "The Phrase That Pays", "Down and Out" and "Black Mamba"; new songs "Pour Yourself a Drink" and "The Fever"; as well as a cover of John Lennon's "Working Class Hero". For the recording, the band returned to The Gallery of Carpet studio to work with engineer Brian Zieske, who produced and recorded their self-titled EP, before the band appended the "Is..." to their name.

== Track listing ==
All tracks are written by William Beckett, except where otherwise noted.

No.	Title	Length
1.	"Pour Yourself a Drink" (Basement Demo)	1:28
2.	"The Fever"	3:40
3.	"The Phrase That Pays" (Nashville version)	4:01
4.	"Working Class Hero" (John Lennon cover)	3:41
5.	"Down and Out" (featuring Sheldon Miller of This Is Me Smiling [Piano rendition])	5:15
6.	"Black Mamba" (Three in the Morning PartyMix)	3:07
