= Songs from the Eye of an Elephant =

Songs from the Eye of An Elephant

Studio album by Ryan Star
- Released: September 19, 2005
- Genre: Rock, folk
- Label: Koch Records

Ryan Star chronology
Songs from the Eye of An Elephant (2005)	Dark Horse – A Live Collection (2006)

Songs from the Eye of An Elephant is the first solo album by singer/songwriter Ryan Star. It was first released independently on Stone Crow Records in 2005. The album was re-released with major distribution on September 19, 2006 by KOCH Records shortly after Star's appearance on the CBS reality show Rock Star: Supernova.

== Track listing ==
1. "We Might Fall"
2. "So Ordinary"
3. "Famous Love"
4. "Losing Your Memory"
5. "Psycho Suicidal Girls"
6. "O"
7. "Back of Your Car"
8. "Saw You in Heaven"
9. "The Same When I'm Alone"
10. "Dance with You"
11. "Sink or Swim"
12. "Perfect"
13. "Famous Yet"
14. "The First Time"
15. "Waiting for Love"
16. "Here Son"
17. "Take a Ride with Me"
18. "The Fairy Tale"
19. "The One You Know"
20. "Lullaby Suicide"
