= What Will Be (EP) =

EP by William Beckett
- Released: October 30, 2012
- Genre: Pop rock, pop
- Length: 13:51
- Label: YIKE Records

William Beckett chronology
Winds Will Change EP (2012)	What Will Be (2012)	The Pioneer Sessions (2013)

What Will Be is William Beckett's third EP. It was released on October 30, 2012, under YIKE Records. Beckett later recorded acoustic versions of every song on this EP for The Pioneer Sessions.

== Track listing ==
All tracks are written by William Beckett.

No.	Title	Length
1.	"Stuck in Love" (featuring Ryan Ross)	2:57
2.	"Slip Away"	3:27
3.	"Dear Life"	3:44
4.	"Our Story's Already Been Told" (featuring Ryan Ross)	3:43
Total length:		13:51
