= P.S. I Love You (film) =

2007 film by Richard LaGravenese

- American theatrical release poster
- Directed by: Richard LaGravenese
- Screenplay by: Richard LaGravenese; Steven Rogers
- Based on: PS, I Love You by Cecelia Ahern
- Produced by: Wendy Finerman; Broderick Johnson; Andrew Kosove; Molly Smith
- Starring: Hilary Swank; Gerard Butler; Lisa Kudrow; Harry Connick Jr.; Gina Gershon; Jeffrey Dean Morgan; Kathy Bates
- Cinematography: Terry Stacey
- Edited by: David Moritz
- Music by: John Powell
- Production companies: Alcon Entertainment; Grosvenor Park Productions; Wendy Finerman Productions; 2S Films
- Distributed by: Warner Bros. Pictures (United States); Momentum Pictures (United Kingdom); Summit Entertainment (International)
- Release dates: December 21, 2007 (United States); January 4, 2008 (United Kingdom)
- Running time: 126 minutes
- Countries: United States; United Kingdom
- Language: English
- Budget: $30 million
- Box office: $157 million

P.S. I Love You is a 2007 romantic comedy film directed by Richard LaGravenese from a screenplay by LaGravenese and Steven Rogers. It is based on the 2004 novel of the same name by Cecelia Ahern. The film stars Hilary Swank, Gerard Butler, Lisa Kudrow, Gina Gershon, James Marsters, Harry Connick Jr., Jeffrey Dean Morgan, and Kathy Bates.

The film was released in the United States by Warner Bros. Pictures on December 21, 2007, and in the United Kingdom by Momentum Pictures on January 4, 2008. It received generally negative reviews from critics, with criticism being directed at Swank's casting and the writing. It was a box office success, grossing $157 million worldwide against a $30 million budget.

== Plot ==
Holly and her Irish husband Gerry live in Manhattan. They fight passionately, and are deeply in love. When Gerry dies of a brain tumor after ten years together, grief causes Holly to withdraw from her family and friends.

On Holly's birthday, a cake is delivered along with a cassette that holds a recording from Gerry – the first of several meaningful messages he had arranged to have delivered to her after his death, and all ending with "P.S. I Love You". Holly's mother Patricia, who never warmed to Gerry marrying her daughter, worries that the messages will keep Holly tied to the past.

The occasional messages encourage Holly to continue living. Meanwhile, he has arranged for her to travel to his childhood homeland with her two best friends, Denise and Sharon. At a holiday cottage in the Irish countryside, they find letters addressed to each of them; one asks Denise to take Holly to Gerry's favorite pub. While there, Holly meets William, a singer who strongly reminds her of Gerry. He dedicates a song, "Galway Girl", to her; upon hearing it, she is overcome with emotion and walks out, as it was the same song Gerry sang to her when they first met.

While out fishing on the lake, the women lose the oars, leaving them stranded. As they wait for help, Sharon announces she is pregnant and Denise reveals she is engaged. Their news causes Holly to relapse emotionally and begin to withdraw again. They are eventually rescued by William, whom Sharon and Denise invite to stay the night because of the rain.

Unable to deny their mutual attraction, William and Holly have sex. They later have a conversation about Gerry, and when she mentions she plans to go visit his parents, he realizes she is the widow of his childhood friend. Holly panics, but William calms her by relating to her stories about his and Gerry's friendship. The next day, Holly visits Gerry's parents, who give her another letter from Gerry, reminding her of how they met.

Arriving home, Holly remains withdrawn, but is inspired to start designing women's shoes after finding one of Gerry's suspender clips on one of her high heels. She enrolls in a design class, and her new found confidence allows her to emerge from her solitude and genuinely embrace her friends' happiness.

Holly goes out to dinner with her old friend Daniel, who reveals he has always had feelings for her. Knowing those feelings are unreciprocated, and after she accidentally calls him Gerry, Daniel leaves the restaurant.

While on a walk together, Patricia hands Holly a final letter from Gerry, revealing she was the one he had asked to deliver all of the messages. She said that, although she felt it was inappropriate, she could not deny his request.

Holly returns home to a voicemail from Daniel. They meet at Yankee Stadium and she asks him to read the letter. In it, Gerry tells her not to turn away from new love. Holly and Daniel share a kiss. However, there is no spark, so they decide to remain friends.

Later, Holly takes her mother on a trip to Ireland. By chance they meet William and his father. His dad flirts with Patricia and he expresses a wish to see Holly again.

== Cast ==
- Hilary Swank as Holly Kennedy
- Gerard Butler as Gerry Kennedy, Holly's late husband
- Lisa Kudrow as Denise Hennessey, one of Holly's best friends
- Harry Connick Jr. as Daniel Connelly, Patricia's employee and Holly's new friend
- Gina Gershon as Sharon McCarthy, one of Holly's best friends
- Jeffrey Dean Morgan as William Gallagher, Holly's love interest and Gerry's childhood best friend
- Kathy Bates as Patricia Reilly, Holly's mother
- James Marsters as John McCarthy, Sharon's husband and Gerry's best friend
- Nellie McKay as Ciara Reilly, Holly's sister
- Dean Winters as Tom, Denise's boyfriend and later fiancé
- Anne Kent as Rose Kennedy, Gerry's mother
- Brian McGrath as Martin Kennedy, Gerry's father

== Production ==
In A Conversation with Cecilia Ahern, a bonus feature on the DVD release of the film, the author of the novel discusses the Americanization of her story — which was set in Ireland — for the screen and her satisfaction with the plot changes which screenwriter and director Richard LaGravenese had to make in order to fit the book into the screen.

The film was shot on locations in New York City and County Wicklow, Ireland. The music scenes that were set in a local Wicklow pub were filmed in Whelan's, a music venue in Dublin. In 2019, Swank expressed interest in adapting the follow-up book into a second film.

== Soundtrack ==
P.S. I Love You

Soundtrack album by Various Artists
- Released: December 3, 2007
- Genre: Pop
- Length: 56:44
- Label: Atlantic

The soundtrack for the film was released on December 4, 2007.

1. "Love You Till the End" – The Pogues
2. "Same Mistake" – James Blunt
3. "More Time" – Needtobreathe
4. "Carousel" – Laura Izibor
5. "Fortress" – Hope
6. "Last Train Home" – Ryan Star
7. "Rewind" – Paolo Nutini
8. "My Sweet Song" – Toby Lightman
9. "No Other Love" – Chuck Prophet
10. "Everything We Had" – The Academy Is...
11. "In the Beginning" – The Stills
12. "If I Ever Leave This World Alive" – Flogging Molly
13. "P.S. I Love You" – Nellie McKay
14. "Kisses and Cake" – John Powell
15. "Trouble" – performed by Greg Dulli and Kerry Brown

The film also includes "Fairytale of New York" performed by The Pogues, "Got Me Like Oh" by Gia Farrell, "Mustang Sally" performed by Gerard Butler and "Galway Girl" written and originally released by Steve Earle, performed by Gerard Butler, Nancy Davis, and Jeffrey Dean Morgan. Camera Obscura's "Lloyd, I'm Ready to Be Heartbroken" also plays in the opening credits. None of these songs are included on the official soundtrack. The Japanese version has "Chiisana Inori" by Hideaki Tokunaga as its theme song.

All tracks are written by John Powell.

P.S. I Love You
No.	Title	Length
1.	"Make Up Kisses"	3:00
2.	"Bette Davis Montage"	1:13
3.	"You Gotta Be Rich"	0:52
4.	"The Cake"	1:46
5.	"The Urn"	2:00
6.	"Puke/ 1st Letter"	2:43
7.	"Holly Gets Fired"	0:45
8.	"Jacket"	1:27
9.	"Travel Agent"	4:04
10.	"To Eire"	2:54
11.	"Reading Letter"	0:47
12.	"William On The Lake"	1:23
13.	"Kitchen Waltz"	4:53
14.	"On The Lake"	2:28
15.	"The Kennedys"	1:08
16.	"Last Tune"	0:50
17.	"Gerry's Fort"	1:04
18.	"The Meeting"	4:31
19.	"The Kiss"	1:56
20.	"Home Again"	0:33
21.	"Enough"	0:39
22.	"Somebody's Gerry"	1:43
23.	"It Was Me"	3:35
24.	"Sis Kiss"	2:37
25.	"P.S. I Love You"	1:23
Total length:		50:00

== Reception ==
=== Critical response ===
On review aggregation website Rotten Tomatoes it has a score of 25% based on 105 reviews, with an average rating of 4.5/10. The website's critical consensus reads, "Hilary Swank is miscast as the romantic lead in this clichéd film about loss and love." On Metacritic the film has a weighted average score of 39 out of 100, based on reviews from 24 critics, indicating "generally unfavorable reviews". Audiences surveyed by CinemaScore gave the film a grade "A−" on scale of A to F.

Manohla Dargis of The New York Times said the film "looks squeaky clean and utterly straight and very much removed from the shadow worlds in which Ms. Swank has done her best work. Yet as directed by Richard LaGravenese ... it has a curious morbid quality ... [It] won't win any awards; it isn't the sort of work that flatters a critic's taste. It's preposterous in big and small matters ... and there are several cringe-worthy set pieces, some involving Mr. Butler and a guitar. The film is not a beautiful object or a memorable cultural one, and yet it charms, however awkwardly. Ms. Swank's ardent sincerity and naked emotionalism dovetail nicely with Mr. LaGravenese's melodramatic excesses." Stephen Whitty of The Oregonian wrote, "On a week when many people just want a good reason to put down their packages and smile for a couple of hours, P.S. I Love You arrives – signed, sealed and delivered just on time."

David Wiegand of the San Francisco Chronicle wrote, "This is a movie that will leave you stunned and stupefied from beginning to end, if you don't head for the exits first. The only good things in it are Lisa Kudrow and Swank's wardrobe. The plot is unbelievable, although a competent script could have fixed that. The direction is flabby and uninspired, the casting is wrongheaded, and the performances run the gamut from uninteresting to insufferable ... the film wants terribly to be Ghost without a potter's wheel, but it just succeeds at being terrible." John Anderson of Variety also had a negative review: "The question of love after death has been asked frequently enough in the movies, but seldom with the high ick factor found in P.S. I Love You ... this post-life comedy will have the sentimentally challenged weeping openly, while clutching desperately to the pants-legs of boyfriends and husbands who are trying to flee up the aisle. Richard LaGravenese's trip into Lifetime territory may define the guilty pleasure of the genre ... As an exercise in chick-flickery, P.S. I Love You wants to possess the soulfulness of harsh reality and the lilt of romantic fantasy at the same time. In this case, at least, it simply can't be done."

Irish reviewers were particularly critical of Butler's Irish accent. Butler later jokingly apologized for his poor effort at an Irish accent.

=== Box office ===
The film opened on 2,454 screens in North America and earned $6.4 million and ranked #6 on its opening weekend. It eventually grossed $53.7 million at the North American box office and $103 million in the rest of the world for a total worldwide box office of $157 million.

=== Accolades ===
Hilary Swank won the 2008 People's Choice Irish Film and Television Award for Best International Actress.

== Cultural influence ==
Dialogue between Connick's and Swank's characters inspired Reba McEntire's 2011 single "Somebody's Chelsea".

== See also ==
- The Letter (1997 film) South Korean film with a similar story
- The Letter (2004 film) Thai remake of the 2004 Korean film
