= Waid Vanderpoel =

Waid Robert Vanderpoel (May 19, 1922 – August 25, 2003) was an American financier and conservationist born in the neighborhood of Norwood Park, Chicago, Illinois. With a degree in finance, Vanderpoel was a notable financier throughout his career. He died in Barrington, Illinois.

== Personal life and education ==
Waid Vanderpoel was born and raised in Norwood Park, a northwest Chicago neighborhood, to Helen and Robert Vanderpoel. His father was a well-respected financial journalist for the Chicago Sun-Times who coined the phrase "the most successful businessman is the man who holds onto the old just as long as it is good, and grabs the new just as soon as it is better". Vanderpoel was also the nephew of noted painter John Vanderpoel.

He attended Schurz High School, graduating near the top of his class in 1939. Upon graduation, he attended Grinnell College, from which he graduated in 1943 with a degree in finance. After school, Vanderpoel was drafted into the Army, serving from 1943 to 1945 as a corporal in World War II in France and central Europe. He met Ruth Silbermann in 1947 and they married later that year. Over the next decade, they had five sons: John, Tom, William, James, and Mark.

== Career ==
In 1946, Vanderpoel joined the First National Bank of Chicago (now a part of JPMorgan Chase) as an investment portfolio manager, eventually working his way to Senior Vice President and Chief Investment Officer. During his tenure as an executive, he was instrumental in helping the bank grow domestically and abroad, as offices were added in London, Tokyo, and Beijing. He also became known as an international expert on the effects of inflation in the global economy. He quickly became one of the preeminent voices in finance, widely quoted in national periodicals, resulting in an award from the Financial Analyst Society for his work with Governor George Romney on tax relief for stock dividends.

== Conservation efforts ==
After retiring from the bank, Vanderpoel devoted much of his time to land conservation and prairie restoration. He volunteered time with Citizens for Conservation, a Chicago-area organization with a mission of saving living space for living things. He eventually becoming the organization's two-time president; he helped it acquire over 1,200 acres (4.9 km^{2}) of land for preservation and restoration, and helped save numerous plant and animal species from extirpation. He received national attention for directing Citizens for Conservation's efforts, and for his ability to lead successful negotiations and bridge the gap between business and environmental concerns.

== Rock gardening ==
Vanderpoel was also a widely recognized rock gardener, dedicating much of his 5-acre (20,000 m^{2}) property in Barrington to the craft. He was a member of the North American Rock Garden Society, and co-authored a 1996 book entitled Handbook on Troughs.

== Awards and honors ==
- Financial Analyst of the Year award from the Financial Analyst Society, for his work with George Romney in developing legislation concerning tax relief for stock dividends
- Recipient of the Barrington, Illinois citizen of the year award, 1993
- Honored by the Illinois General Assembly with Senate Resolution SR0299

== Works ==
- Handbook on Troughs, Waid Vanderpoel, Gwen Kelaidis, et al., North American Rock Garden Society, 1996, ISBN 0-9675093-0-0
