= The Academy (EP) =

EP by The Academy
- Released: March 23, 2004
- Recorded: The Gallery of Carpet (Villa Park, Illinois)
- Genre: Emo, post-hardcore, pop punk
- Length: 25:41
- Label: LLR Recordings
- Producer: Brian Zieske

The Academy chronology
The Academy (2004)	Almost Here (2005)

Professional ratings
Review scores
Source	Rating
Decapolis	2.5/4 stars
NowOnTour	2.5/5 stars
Punknews.org	2/5 stars

The Academy is the eponymous debut EP of The Academy Is..., released on March 23, 2004 by LLR Recordings. The CD was originally released before the band appended the "Is..." to their name. It features drummer Mike DelPrincipe and guitarist AJ LaTrace, who left the band after the recording of their full-length debut, Almost Here (2005).

== Track listing ==
All tracks are written by William Beckett.

No.	Title	Length
1.	"The Proverbial Unrest"	2:36
2.	"The Author"	5:08
3.	"Judas Kiss"	3:57
4.	"In Our Defense"	4:31
5.	"Dear Interceptor"	3:42
6.	"Absolution"	5:44
Total length:		25:38

== Personnel ==
- William Beckett – vocals
- Mike Carden – rhythm guitar
- Michael DelPrincipe – drums
- AJ LaTrace – lead guitar
- Adam T. Siska – bass
