= Almost Here (The Academy Is... album) =

Studio album by The Academy Is...
- Released: February 8, 2005
- Studio: Wisner Productions (St. Cloud, Florida)
- Genre: Pop-punk; emo pop; alternative rock; pop rock
- Length: 32:57
- Label: Fueled by Ramen
- Producer: James Paul Wisner

The Academy Is... chronology
The Academy (2004)	Almost Here (2005)	From the Carpet (2006)

Singles from Almost Here
- 1. "Checkmarks" Released: May 29, 2006; 2. "Slow Down" Released: June 17, 2006; 3. "The Phrase That Pays" Released: 2006

Almost Here is the debut studio album by American rock band The Academy Is..., released on February 8, 2005 by Fueled by Ramen.

== Background ==
On April 13, 2004, the Academy Is signed to Fueled by Ramen; in the same month, they went on tour supporting Less Than Jake. On July 6, 2004, a demo of "Slow Down" was posted on their PureVolume account; that same month, they went toured the US with Fall Out Boy, Armor for Sleep and Bayside.

Almost Here was recorded at Wisner Productions in St. Cloud, Florida, with James Paul Wisner, who produced, engineered, and recorded the sessions. He also mixed the album with Jeremy Dubois at The Dungeon in Miami, Florida; Alan Douches mastered the album at West West Side Music.

After recording the album and a doing a summer tour, the band underwent a lineup change. Tom Conrad, formerly of Chicago local band 504 Plan, replaced AJ LaTrace as second guitarist/backing vocalist and Andy Mrotek, formerly of Last Place Champs, replaced Mike DelPrincipe as the drummer. Andy Mrotek and Thomas Conrad are listed in the liner notes, but were added to the band after the recording of Almost Here to replace DelPrincipe and LaTrace, respectively.

== Release ==
In August 2004, it was reported that the band's upcoming debut, titled Almost Here, was schueled for release early next year. Following this, they toured with the Matches, Lucky Boys Confusion and Armor for Sleep in October. In January and February 2005, the band toured across the US alongside Something Corporate, Hidden in Plain View, Straylight Run, and Armor for Sleep. Almost Here was released on February 8 through Fueled by Ramen; it was promoted in the US with the Fueled By Ramen & Friends Tour between March and May 2005, alongside labelmates Fall Out Boy and Gym Class Heroes, as well as Midtown and Silverstein. In addition to this, they appeared at The Bamboozle festival. In mid-June, a music video for "Checkmarks" premiered on Fuse's Oven Fresh programme. In July 2005, the band toured with Plain White T's, Days Away and June, and appeared on the 2005 Warped Tour. Following this, they went on a cross-country US tour with Hidden in Plain View, Spitalfield and Halifax in August and September 2005.

In January 2006, the band went on a sold-out UK tour with Panic! at the Disco. In February and March, the group went on the Truckstops and Statelines tour, alongside Panic! at the Disco, Acceptance and Hellogoodbye. On February 21, the band released an acoustic EP, titled From the Carpet, which included three songs from Almost Here: "The Phrase That Pays", "Down and Out" and "Black Mamba". The band went on the 2006 edition of the Warped Tour.

The album spawned three singles: "Checkmarks", "Slow Down" (often incorrectly referred to as "Hollywood Hills"), which was chosen through an online poll on the band's website, and "The Phrase That Pays". "Classifieds" was an intended single from the album and a video was made for the song. This video was never officially released, but the video's director posted it on YouTube.

== Reception and legacy ==
Professional ratings
Review scores
Source	Rating
AbsolutePunk	(89%)
AllMusic	3.5/5 stars
Melodic	2.5/5 stars
musicOMH	3/5 stars
Sputnikmusic	4.5/5

The album debuted at #20 on the Billboard Top Heatseekers chart, as well as at #24 on the Billboard Independent Albums chart. It also charted at #185 on The Billboard Top 200 Albums Chart. By May 2006, the album had sold over 144,000 copies. By October 2009, the album's sales stood at 265,000.

BuzzFeed included the album at number 33 on their "36 Pop Punk Albums You Need To Hear Before You F——ing Die" list. Cleveland.com ranked "Checkmarks" at number 88 on their list of the top 100 pop-punk songs.

On February 6, 2010, The Academy Is... performed a 5th Anniversary Show for the album with Sing It Loud and special guest.

On September 12, 2015, rumors were confirmed that the band would embark on a 10th Anniversary show for Riot Fest in Chicago. Following the announcement of the Riot Fest reunion show, the band released dates for the 10th Anniversary U.S. tour.

== Track listing ==
All songs written by Mike Carden and William Beckett, except "Down and Out" by Beckett. All lyrics by Beckett.

No.	Title	Length
1.	"Attention"	2:53
2.	"Season"	3:34
3.	"Slow Down"	4:02
4.	"The Phrase That Pays"	3:17
5.	"Black Mamba"	2:46
6.	"Skeptics and True Believers"	2:54
7.	"Classifieds"	2:52
8.	"Checkmarks"	3:00
9.	"Down and Out"	4:30
10.	"Almost Here"	3:06
Total length:		32:57

== Personnel ==
Adapted credits from the Almost Here liner notes.

The Academy Is...

- William Beckett – vocals
- AJ LaTrace – guitars
- Mike Carden – guitars
- Adam T. Siska – bass
- Mike DelPrincipe – drums

Production and design

- James Paul Wisner – producer, engineer, recording, mixing
- Jeremy Dubois – mixing
- Alan Douches – mastering
- Evan Leake – graphic design

== Charts ==
Chart performance
Chart (2006)	Peak position
UK Albums (OCC)	199
UK Rock & Metal Albums (OCC)	11
US Billboard 200	185
US Heatseekers Albums (Billboard)	7
US Independent Albums (Billboard)	16
