= Why We Fight (Gatsbys American Dream album) =

Studio album by Gatsbys American Dream
- Released: July 23, 2002
- Genre: Pop punk, punk rock, progressive rock
- Label: Rocketstar Recordings
- Producer: Aaron Sprinkle

Gatsbys American Dream chronology
Why We Fight (2002)	Ribbons and Sugar (2003)

Why We Fight is the debut album by Seattle-based Gatsbys American Dream.

It is the only album including former drummer Dustin McGhye who remained for two tours after the CD release and was replaced by Waxwing drummer Rudy Gajadhar, and bassist Josh Berg who remained only to the end of the recording session, where he was replaced by current bassist Kirk Huffman.

== Track listing ==
1. "Fall of George Mallory"
2. "Where Shadows Lie"
3. "Castaway"
4. "Golden Ticket"
5. "Nobody Wins"
6. "Nicarockya"
7. "Beware, Beware"
8. "Game Over"
9. "The Child"
10. "Why We Fight"

== Personnel ==
- Nic Newsham - vocals
- Bobby Darling - guitar/vocals
- Ryan Van Wieringen - guitar
- Josh Berg - bass/vocals
- Dustin McGhye - drums
