= LLR Recordings =

- Founded: 2001
- Founder: Johnny Minardi; Tony Marino
- Genre: Pop punk; emo; punk rock; alternative rock
- Country of origin: United States
- Location: Chicago, IL

LLR Recordings (previously Little League Records 1998-2001) was a Chicago-based record label founded by Johnny Minardi and Tony Marino in August 2001. The label released records including the debut EP of The Academy Is..., the Remember Maine album The Last Place You Look, and the Hidden In Plain View EP Operation: Cut-Throat.

The company announced their closure following Minardi's move to work for Fueled by Ramen via a message on their website in 2005 stating "Goodnight sweet prince".

== Discography ==
Title	Artist	Year	Format	Catalogue Number
Balloons...Everything's Ok.	August Premier	2001	Album	LLR001
Treehouse Talk	504Plan	2001	CD, Album	LLR002
Split	After Project, Star Of Earendil	2003	CD, EP	LLR004
The Last Place You Look	Remember Maine	2002	CD, Album	LLR005
Operation: Cut-Throat	Hidden In Plain View	2002	CD, EP, Dig	LLR006
Two To The Chest To Remember, One To The Head To Forget	Feeling Left Out	2003	CD, Album	LLR007
Once Upon A Time	Feeling Left Out	2003	CD	LLR008
The Academy	The Academy Is...	2004	CD, Album, EP, Enh	LLR009
In The Land Of Lost Monsters	Gatsbys American Dream	2004	CD, EP, Promo	LLR010
Manner	Afterproject	2004	CD, Album	Unknown
