= Barrington High School (Illinois) =

Location
- 616 West Main Street; Barrington, Illinois 60010; United States; 42°09′25″N 88°08′53″W

Information
- Opened: 1949; 77 years ago
- School district: Barrington Community Unit School District 220
- Superintendent: Dr. Craig Winkelman
- Principal: Steve McWilliams
- Teaching staff: 168.00 (FTE)
- Grades: 9–12
- Gender: coed
- Enrollment: 2,718 (2024-2025)
- Average class size: 22.0
- Student to teacher ratio: 16.18
- Campus: suburban
- Colors: scarlet black white
- Athletics conference: Mid-Suburban Conference
- Mascot: Bronco Billy
- Nickname: Broncos
- Publication: Nuance
- Newspaper: Round-Up
- Yearbook: Corral
- Website: bhs.barrington220.org
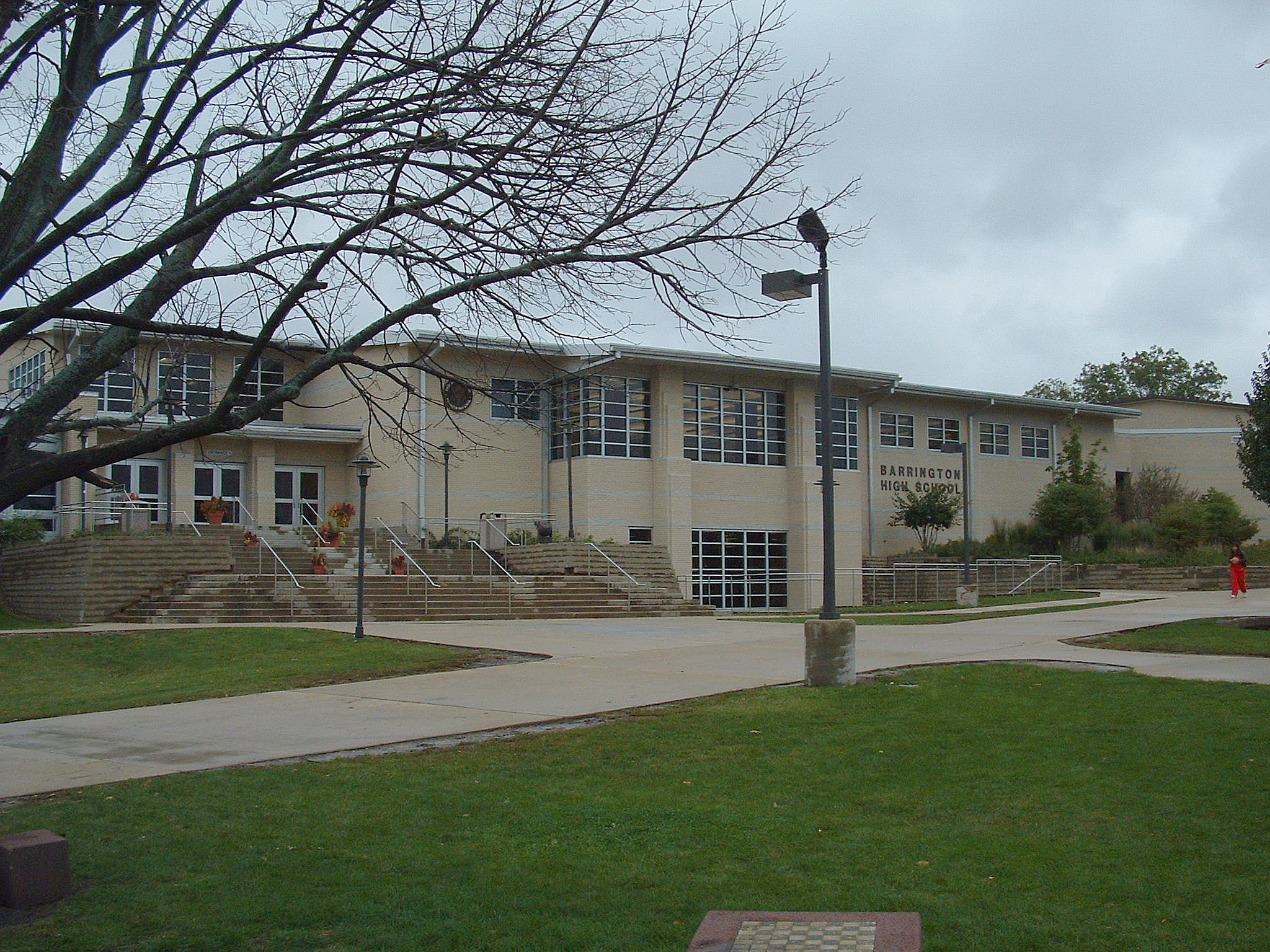

Barrington High School is a public four-year high school located in Barrington, Illinois, a northwest suburb of Chicago, Illinois, in the United States. It is part of Barrington Community Unit School District 220.

== History ==
=== Original structure ===
Although the village of Barrington incorporated in 1865, the area did not have a dedicated permanent high school until 1949. Before that, Barrington had a K-12 school on Hough Street. On February 8, 1947, the village held an election to choose a site for a new high school. Of approximately 1,414 ballots cast, 1,013 were cast in favor of selecting the current location on West Main Street. Voters also granted the village authority to purchase the 70-acre site, issue bonds for the high school's construction, and build the high school. The original purchase price for the site was $37,000.00. At the time, some residents complained that the tract bought had been too large; the opposition countered that unless the tract stretched far to the north, other residents and/or businesses might purchase that land, and the board would not be able to buy the land as cheaply later. The Consolidated High School Board of Education, now Community Unit School District 220, consulted authorities on location, educational needs and the most fitting type of building allowing for future planning. The board engaged the architectural firm of Perkins and Will to design the original structure. The village issued $940,000.00 in bonds for the site and building; however, due to rising construction prices at the time, the high school as planned could not be completed for that amount. On June 12, 1948, an election increased the authorization for such bonds by an additional $328,000.00 by a decision of 388 to 71. Groundbreaking on the high school took place on July 10, 1948, and engineer George Gilfeather supervised the ensuing construction almost daily. Classes began in the new building on September 12, 1949, under Superintendent F.C. Thomas.

=== Additions and expansions ===
In February 1955, an election to expand the high school granted a bond issue of $850,000.00 by a vote of 880 to 117. These funds were used to add a wing to the west end of the building that connected the school to the gymnasium and add a second story to the original building at the north end; these additions were completed in September 1956. On November 8, 1958, voters permitted bonds in the amount of $1,600,000.00 to be used for a further addition on the east side of the building, including twenty-three classrooms, an auxiliary gymnasium, and an auditorium. These improvements began in 1959 and were completed in the fall of 1960. In 1999, Barrington voters approved an additional bond issuance for substantial remodeling and expansion of the high school. This expansion included updating the building's classroom and athletic facilities as well as adding additional accommodations for the school's approximately 2,400 students. In January 2024, construction was completed on a front atrium addition. Several other interior spaces were also renovated at the time.

== Academics ==
Barrington High School reported that, in 2011, its students scored a composite average of 25 on the ACT college entrance exam, which is reportedly the highest average in the school's history and roughly four points higher than the state and national averages. The school is ranked No. 553 on Newsweek's 2008 list of the 1,300 best public high schools in America. Ninety-eight percent of Barrington's graduates enroll in college or post-graduate training programs. However, as of 2008, the State of Illinois found that Barrington had not made Adequate Yearly Progress as a part of the federal No Child Left Behind Act, as multiple student sub-groups failed to make minimum progress.

According to the College Board, Barrington High School ranks in the top 1% of more than 14,350 high schools both nationally and internationally for the number of AP exams taken by students. District 220 has received the 2004 Bright A+ award for academic excellence from SchoolSearch. Barrington schools rank in the top 5% of Illinois districts, and SchoolMatch has selected District 220 as being among the top 16% of the nation's public school districts being recognized through their Educational Effectiveness Audits. The Physics Program, developed over 25 years, was featured in "Beyond 2000", an Australian television production. The Fine Arts Department is also one of the most comprehensive in Illinois. The studio-based art program received a state award for excellence, and an in-house gallery features regional and professional artists.

== Fine Arts ==
In 2013, Barrington High School's Chamber Choir, formerly under the direction of Nancie Kozel-Tobison, was among 5 high school choral programs in the United States to perform in a choir festival in Carnegie Hall run by Choirs of America. Vocal ensembles, including madrigal groups, have performed at the White House, the Sydney Opera House, Chicago's Orchestra Hall, the Kennedy Center, the Capitol Hill Club, the Supreme Court, and the Goodman Theater, among other venues, festivals, and competitions.

BHS also is home to a bi-weekly school video production called BHS-TV, which has worked directly with CBS, WGN, FOX, Hollywood Chicago, Chicago Bears, Blackhawks, NFL Films, Gatorade, Chicago Cubs, Chicago Bulls, Chicago Bandits, Windy City Bulls, 365 Barrington and Quintessential Barrington. Students enrolled in BHS-TV have raised more than eight million dollars for charities and have earned more than 70 Student Excellence Awards from the National Television Academy. BHS-TV has also earned the award for Best News Program in the Midwest multiple times. In 2015 and 2016 President Obama invited the BHS-TV video students and their instructor to the White House Film Festival.

== Athletics ==
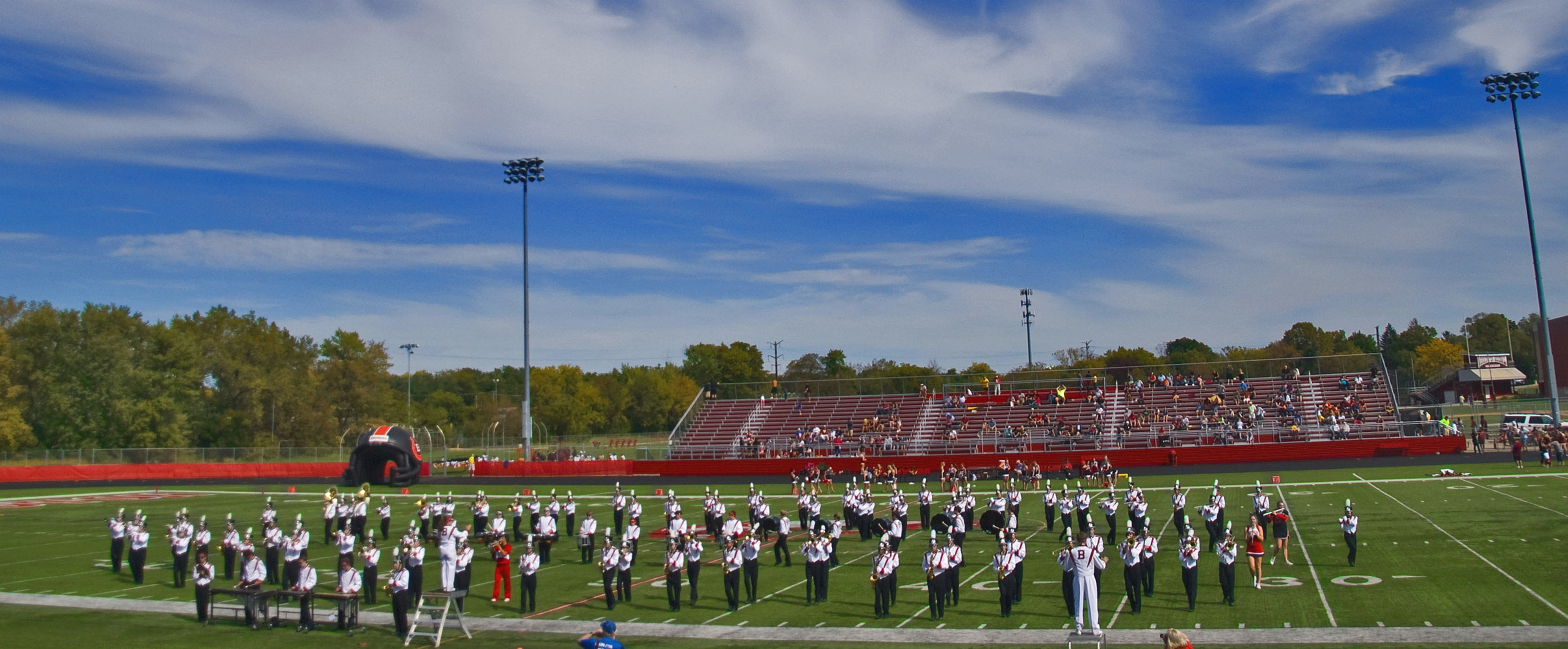
Barrington High School marching band at homecoming football game

The school sponsors interscholastic athletic teams for young men and women in basketball, cross-country, cheerleading, golf, gymnastics, lacrosse, soccer, swimming, diving, tennis, track & field, volleyball, and water polo. Men may also compete in baseball, football, and wrestling. Women may compete in badminton, bowling, and softball.

While not sponsored by the IHSA, the school also sponsors teams for men and women in ice hockey, in addition to pom poms.

Some teams have won their respective IHSA sponsored state championship tournament, including Baseball 1985–86, Cross Country (girls) 2003–04, 2024, and 2025. Golf (boys) 1992–93, Gymnastics (girls) 1999–2000, Soccer (boys) 2007–08, Soccer (girls) 2016-17 and 2017–18, and Track & Field (girls) 2006–07.

== Notable alumni ==
- Craig Anderson, professional hockey goalie
- William Beckett, solo artist and lead singer of The Academy Is... The band named their third studio album after the school, ‘Fast Times at Barrington High’
- Paul Bragiel, Colombian National Team cross-country skier, venture capitalist
- Kristin Cavallari, American television personality, fashion designer, and actress
- Kallen Esperian, opera soprano
- Gary Fencik, NFL safety for the Chicago Bears and member of the Super Bowl XX champions
- Jeff Galfer, actor, producer, and writer.
- Gia Gunn, drag queen
- Casey Larson, American ski jumper who competed in both the 2018 Olympics and the 2022 Olympics
- Katrina Lenk, Tony Award-winning actress, instrumentalist, and singer.
- Laura A. Lopez, professor of astronomy studying the life cycle of stars
- Scott Lorenz, professional soccer player for Sporting Kansas City
- Ryan Miller, professional soccer player and coach at the Portland Timbers Academy
- Scotty Miller, NFL wide receiver for the Atlanta Falcons
- Terry Moran, co-anchor of the late–night news magazine program Nightline
- Sam Ojuri, former professional CFL player
- Dan Osinski, former MLB player (Los Angeles Angels, Kansas City Athletics, Milwaukee Braves, Boston Red Sox, Chicago White Sox, Houston Astros)
- Henry M. Paulson, U.S. Treasury Secretary (2006–09)
- Veronica Roth, author of the Divergent trilogy
- Cynthia Rowley, fashion designer
- Peniel Shin, member of K-pop boy group BtoB (band)
- Adam Siska, bass player of Say Anything and The Academy Is...
- Brady Smith, NFL defensive end (1996–2005) for the New Orleans Saints and Atlanta Falcons
- Dan Stevenson, NFL football player for the New England Patriots, Miami Dolphins, and the Houston Texans
- John Trautwein, former MLB player (Boston Red Sox)
- John W Vanderpoel, ornithologist and author
- Lukas Van Ness, professional football player for the Green Bay Packers
- Townes Van Zandt, singer-songwriter
- Joe Walsh, conservative talk radio host and former Republican Representative of Illinois's 8th congressional district
- Amy Walter, political analyst who is the publisher and editor-in-chief of The Cook Political Report with Amy Walter
- Dan Wilson, Major League Baseball catcher (1992–2005)
- Corinne Wood, Lieutenant Governor of Illinois (1999–2003)
- Michelle Wu, mayor of Boston
- Colleen Zenk, actress
