= The America EP =

EP by Ryan Star
- Released: January 13, 2012
- Genre: Rock
- Length: 15:01
- Label: Independent

Ryan Star chronology
11:59 (2010)	The America EP (2012)

The America EP is a four-song EP by American singer-songwriter Ryan Star. It was self-released for free via the internet. The songs "Orphans" and "Somebody's Son" were initially meant to be released on Star's 2010 album 11:59.

The EP is dedicated to Star's grandfather who fought in World War II.

== Track listing ==
All songs written by Ryan Star and Max Collins except track #4 by Tom Petty and Jeff Lynne.

1. "America" (4:28)
2. "Somebody's Son" (3:30)
3. "Orphans" (3:56)
4. "I Won't Back Down" (Tom Petty cover) (3:07)

Professional ratings
Review scores
Source	Rating
Alternative Addiction	4/5 stars
Melodic.net	4/5 stars
