= The Academy Is... =

American rock band

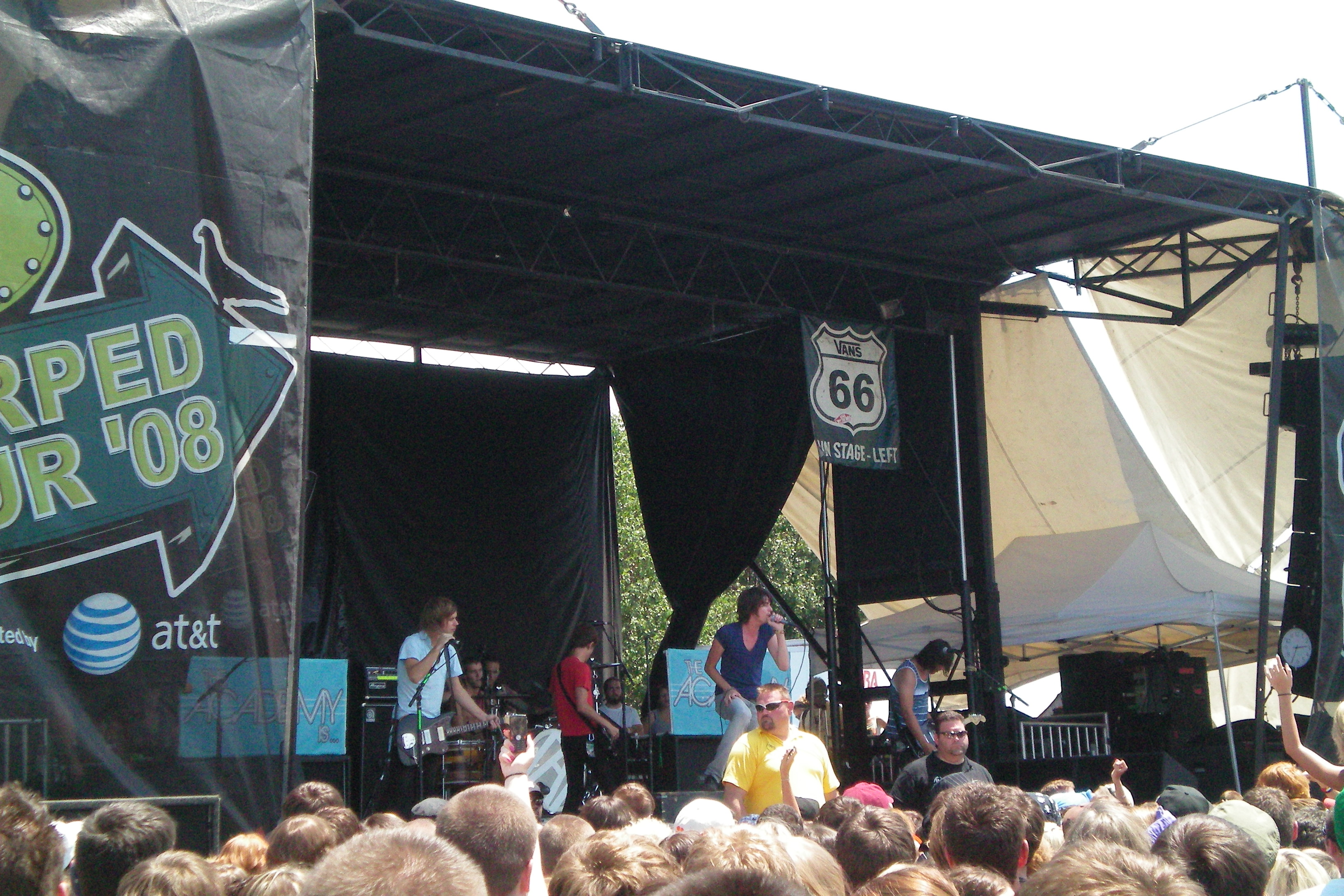
- The Academy Is... performing on the Vans Warped Tour in 2008

Background information
- Origin: Chicago, Illinois, U.S.
- Genres: Pop-punk; emo pop; indie rock
- Years active: 2003–2011; 2015; 2022–present
- Labels: LLR; Fueled by Ramen; Atlantic; Decaydance; I Surrender
- Members: William Beckett; Adam Siska; Mike Carden; Andy Mrotek
- Past members: Mike DelPrincipe; AJ LaTrace; Thomas Conrad; Michael Guy Chislett
- Website: theacademyis.com

The Academy Is... is an American rock band from Chicago, Illinois, formed in 2003. The band is composed of William Beckett (vocals), Adam Siska (bass), Mike Carden (guitar), and Andy Mrotek (drums). In 2004, they were signed by the Decaydance imprint of the Fueled by Ramen label. The band has released four studio albums: Almost Here (2005), Santi (2007), Fast Times at Barrington High (2008), and Almost There (2026), along with four EPs. They temporarily disbanded in 2011.

On May 11, 2022, the band announced a full reunion, alongside a performance at that year's Riot Fest. The band released their first album in 18 years, Almost There, in March 2026.

== History ==
=== Formation and early years (2003–2004) ===
William Beckett and Adam Siska decided to start a band together on March 4, 2003, after becoming friends during their time attending Barrington High School, recruiting Mike Carden (guitar) after his former band, Jodie, broke up. Next they added AJ LaTrace as a lead guitarist and Michael DelPrincipe (Little Mike) as a drummer. They recorded their self-titled debut EP, The Academy (2004), for the Chicago-based label LLR Recordings. LLR Recordings had previously released Beckett's solo project Remember Maine's debut album The Last Place You Look in 2002 and Mike Carden's solo folk album in 2003. The EP was recorded in Villa Park, IL at The Gallery of Carpet by producer Brian Zieske. Pete Wentz from Fall Out Boy heard it and was impressed. In 2004, due to legal reasons, they needed to change their original name "The Academy", and ended up adding the "Is...". The label Fueled by Ramen immediately signed the band. In July and August, the group went on tour with Fall Out Boy, Bayside, Name Taken, and Armor for Sleep.

=== Almost Here (2005–2006) ===
In 2004 the band headed to Florida to record their Fueled by Ramen debut Almost Here, produced by James Paul Wisner, who has worked with Dashboard Confessional, Something Corporate, Further Seems Forever, and Underoath. After recording the album and doing a summer tour, the band underwent a lineup change. Thomas Conrad, formerly of Chicago local band 5o4plan, replaced LaTrace as the second guitarist/backing vocalist, and Andy Mrotek, formerly of Last Place Champs, replaced DelPrincipe as the drummer. Andy Mrotek and Thomas Conrad are listed in the liner notes but were added to the band after the recording of Almost Here to replace DelPrincipe and LaTrace, respectively. The band toured extensively in support of the album, touring with Fall Out Boy, Something Corporate, Midtown, Matchbook Romance, Motion City Soundtrack and Armor for Sleep. The album was released on February 8, 2005 and the following summer, the band embarked on their first headlining tour alongside Plain White T's, Days Away and June. On Billboard's charts Almost Here peaked at No. 7 on Top Heatseekers, No. 16 on Independent Albums, and No. 185 on The Billboard 200. The Academy Is... was also signed to Decaydance that year.

=== Santi (2007) ===
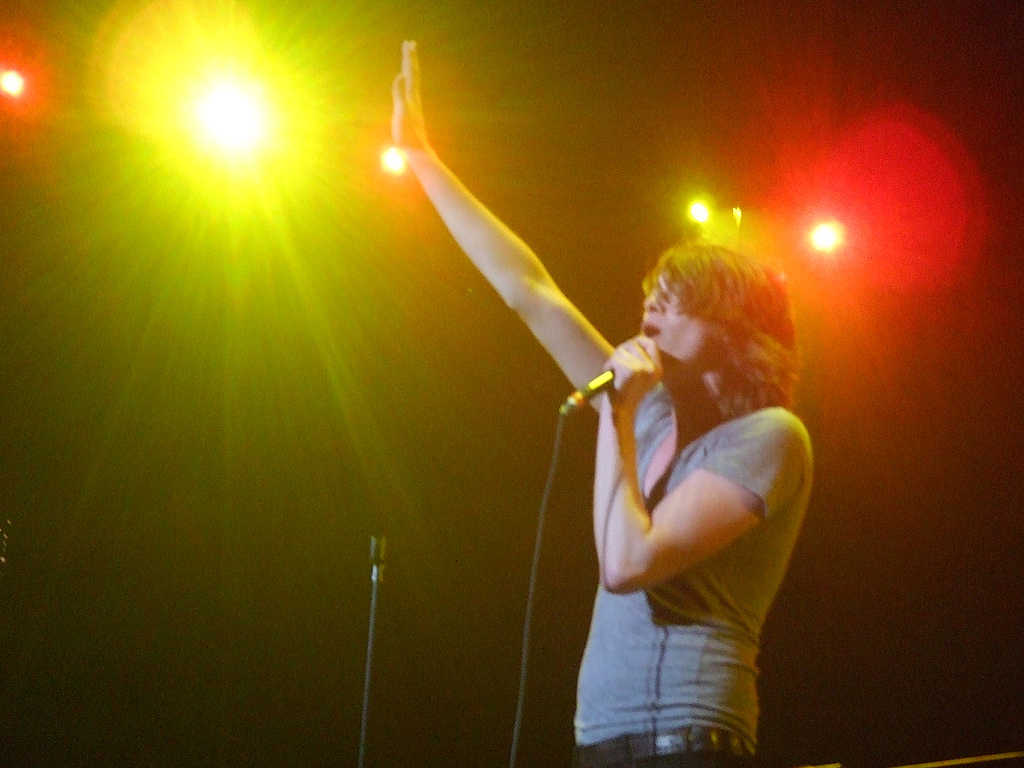
William Beckett performing on the Honda Civic Tour 2007.

While touring as a main act on the 2006 Warped Tour, the band began the process of writing songs for their second album. Once finished, the band flew to Los Angeles to record their record with Butch Walker. As of December 23, 2006, the band had officially finished the recording process and the album, entitled Santi, was released April 3, 2007 on the Fueled By Ramen label. The release of this album was listed on Blender's 25 reasons to love 2007. On January 26, 2007 a sample of "LAX to O'Hare" was released on the band's AbsolutePunk profile. The album peaked at No. 32 on the Billboard 200.

The band went on to release the song "We've Got a Big Mess on Our Hands" as the album's first single, before releasing the album on April 3, 2007. Fall Out Boy, +44, Cobra Starship, and Paul Wall all joined the band on the 2007 Honda Civic Tour, after which the band moved on to the "Sleeping With Giants" tour with support from the Rocket Summer, Armor for Sleep and Sherwood. Partly through the tour, labelmates Cobra Starship were added to the support. The tour ended on November 24, 2007, in Chicago.

=== Fast Times at Barrington High (2008) ===
The band's third studio album, Fast Times at Barrington High, was released on August 19, 2008, through Fueled by Ramen. The title refers to the high school William Beckett, Adam Siska, and videographer Jack Edinger attended. The first single, "About a Girl," was added to the band's MySpace page on July 15, 2008, and was subsequently made available from various download sites. The lead model in the official music video for "About a Girl", Brittany Moser, also went to Barrington at the same time Adam and William were in high school. On August 25, 2008 "About a Girl" was played on The Hills (season 4, episode 2). The album made it onto Rolling Stone Magazine's 50 Best Albums of the Year ranked as No. 46. It peaked at No. 17 on The Billboard 200.

=== Lost in Pacific Time EP and breakup (2009–2011) ===
On William Beckett's Twitter page, it was said The Academy Is... have finished recording their new EP, Lost in Pacific Time: The AP/EP. It was released on September 22, 2009 on iTunes, and was sold on the AP Fall Ball Tour. A limited number were also sold on their webstore The track "I'm Yours Tonight" was released on the band's Myspace page. Another track, "Days Like Masquerades" was played at an anti-suicide benefit at Barrington High School, in Barrington, Illinois. On September 29, 2009, Pete Wentz announced via Twitter that TAI would replace The All-American Rejects for the St. Louis date of the Blink-182 tour, due to an injury to The All-American Rejects lead singer Tyson Ritter.

On May 24, 2011, the band made an announcement on their official website that said that bandmates, Andy Mrotek and Michael Guy Chislett, were leaving the band to pursue their own musical careers. There has reportedly been no hard feelings during this decision. William Beckett also stated that the three remaining members would be entering the studio soon to record their fourth full-length album. On October 8, 2011, the band announced their disbanding on their official Facebook page, stating that they had "decided to go their separate ways" but "though we may not be together, you can look forward to hearing new music from each of us".

During the band's breakup period, Andy Mrotek continued his artistry and his solo project, The Animal Upstairs, while Adam Siska worked as a touring bassist for Say Anything and Carly Rae Jepsen. Lead singer William Beckett focused on his solo work, releasing his first solo single "Compromising Me" on March 13, 2012. He went on to release 3 EPs in 2012: Walk the Talk on April 17, Winds Will Change on July 17, and What Will Be on 30 October. Genuine & Counterfeit, William Beckett's debut solo full-length album, was released August 20, 2013. The album was the first full-length released by William since the break-up of The Academy Is.... It was released by the NY based independent record label Equal Vision Records and it was produced by Marc McClusky.

=== Reunions and Almost There (2015-present) ===
On September 12, 2015, The Academy Is... reunited to play their album Almost Here cover-to-cover at Riot Fest. Former lead guitarist Michael Guy Chislett was the only final member who did not join the reunion. Ian Crawford, known for his roles in The Cab, Panic! at the Disco and Never Shout Never filled in for Chislett. In December 2015, the band embarked on a sixteen-date tour throughout the United States, in which they played Almost Here in its entirety and five additional songs from their back catalog. The band had their final show at The Observatory North Park in San Diego, California on December 30, 2015.

On May 11, 2022, the band's Facebook page announced they would be playing at Riot Fest, alongside the comment "we're back" in reference to the band's future career plans.

On July 8, 2022, former lead guitarist AJ LaTrace announced on Twitter that he and former drummer Michael DelPrincipe would return to the band for a short guest appearance during their set at Riot Fest.

Just under a year later, The Academy is... travelled to England to play three shows, a solo date at The Dome in London on 26 May 2023, as well as two consecutive dates at Slam Dunk Festival in Hatfield and Leeds respectively on 27 and 28 May.

Shortly after, The Academy is... played two sets opening for Fall Out Boy on their North American So Much For (Tour) Dust leg, specifically in Chicago and on their second show in Los Angeles.

The Academy is... played on Andrew McMahon's 'Holiday from Real' Cruise over November 9–13, 2024.

In late 2025, the band embarked on a tour to celebrate the 20th anniversary of their debut album, Almost Here. During the tour, they announced they would be releasing a new album in 2026, and debuted new songs to concertgoers.

On January 14th, 2026, the band announced Almost There, their first album in 18 years. The album's first single, "2005", released alongside a music video on the same day.

On March 27, 2026, the band released their fourth studio album Almost There. The band is currently on tour.

== TAITV ==
TAITV was a video podcast series created by the band. The show, whose initials stand for The Academy Is... TV, was created to allow fans a peek into the offstage life of the band. TAITV episodes are available on iTunes and YouTube, and new episodes aired every Sunday night at 9/8c at the band's website. Guy Ripley, played by Ryland Blackinton (of Cobra Starship) has his own show on TAITV called "Guy Ripley's True Things". The third season of TAITV premiered June 1, 2008. TAITV episodes are made by the band's photographer and friend, Jack "the Camera Guy" Edinger. Jack has appeared in many episodes as cameos, does all voice overs, co-writes, edits, and shoots each episode. He took a break from TAITV to tour with Cobra Starship filming their podcast, CobraCam.Tv, until their new album, Hot Mess, was released. No new episodes have been released since mid-2009. However, on December 5, 2009, bassist Adam Siska stated via his Twitter account that "TAITV is not dead. It's like Han Solo in the carbon tomb between Empire and Jedi. Sooner or later Luke will come kick Jabba's fat ass..."

Because of their disbandment, TAITV was discontinued.

== Bill & Trav's Bogus Journey Tour ==
On October 1, 2008, the band embarked on a co-headlining tour with We the Kings, named "Bill & Trav's Bogus Journey Tour". The name refers to the 1991 movie Bill & Ted's Bogus Journey. Carolina Liar and fellow Decaydance band, Hey Monday also performed on the tour. On November 6, 2008 at House Of Blues in Chicago, Illinois, William Beckett debuted a new song called "Winter Passing" that the band had written only days before. Beckett has said the song is about winter time in the Midwest. He has since incorporated the song into other show sets. The track was released on December 2, 2008 on iTunes.

== Band members ==
Current members

- William Beckett – lead vocals, piano, additional guitar (2003–2011, 2015, 2022–present)
- Adam "Sisky Business" Siska – bass, backing vocals (2003–2011, 2015, 2022–present)
- Mike Carden – rhythm guitar, backing vocals (2003–2011, 2015, 2022–present), lead guitar (2022–present; studio only)
- Andy "The Butcher" Mrotek – drums, percussion, backing vocals (2004–2011, 2015, 2022–present)

Current touring musicians

- Ian Crawford – lead guitar, backing vocals (2015, 2022–2023, 2025–present)

Former members

- Michael DelPrincipe – drums, percussion (2003–2004; live guest 2022)
- AJ LaTrace – lead guitar, backing vocals (2003–2004; live guest 2022)
- Thomas Conrad – lead guitar, backing vocals (2004–2006)
- Michael Guy Chislett – lead guitar, backing vocals (2006–2011; live guest 2026)

Former touring musicians

- Jamie Reed Schefman – lead guitar, backing vocals (2011, 2022–2024)

Timeline

== Discography ==
=== Studio albums ===
List of studio albums
Title	Details	Peak chart positions		
Title	Details	US	AUS	UK
Almost Here	Released: February 8, 2005; Label: Fueled by Ramen (FBR071); Format: CD, DL, LP	185	—	199
Santi	Released: April 3, 2007; Label: Fueled by Ramen/Atlantic/Decaydance (94667); Format: CD, CD+DVD-V, DL	32	—	94
Fast Times at Barrington High	Released: August 19, 2008; Label: Fueled by Ramen (512263); Format: CD, DL, LP	17	30	—
Almost There	Released: March 27, 2026; Label: I Surrender (053); Format: CD, DL, LP	—	—	—
"—" denotes releases that did not chart or were not released in that territory.

=== EPs ===
- The Academy (2004, later rereleased as The Academy Is...)
- From the Carpet (2006)
- Warped Tour Bootleg Series (2006) (only in Rhapsody)
- Lost in Pacific Time: The AP/EP (2009)

=== Singles ===
- "Checkmarks" (2005), No. 115 UK
- "Slow Down" (2006)
- "The Phrase That Pays" (2006)
- "We've Got a Big Mess on Our Hands" (2007)
- "Neighbors" (2007)
- "Everything We Had" (2007)
- "Sleeping with Giants (Lifetime)" (2007)
- "Same Blood" (2007)
- "About a Girl" (2008), No. 88 US Pop, RIAA: Gold
- "Summer Hair = Forever Young" (2008)
- "His Girl Friday" (2009)
- "The Test" (2009)
- "Winter Passing" (2008)
- "I'm Yours Tonight" (2009)
- "Sputter" (2009)
- "2005" (2026)
- "Miracle" (2026)
- "L Train" (2026)

=== Original compilation appearances ===
- MySpace Tribute to The Smashing Pumpkins (2007), contributed "Mayonaise"
- Sound of Superman (2006), contributed "Superman"
- When in Rome (Music from the Original Motion Picture Soundtrack) (2010), contributed "Fox on the Run"
