= William Beckett (singer) =

American musician

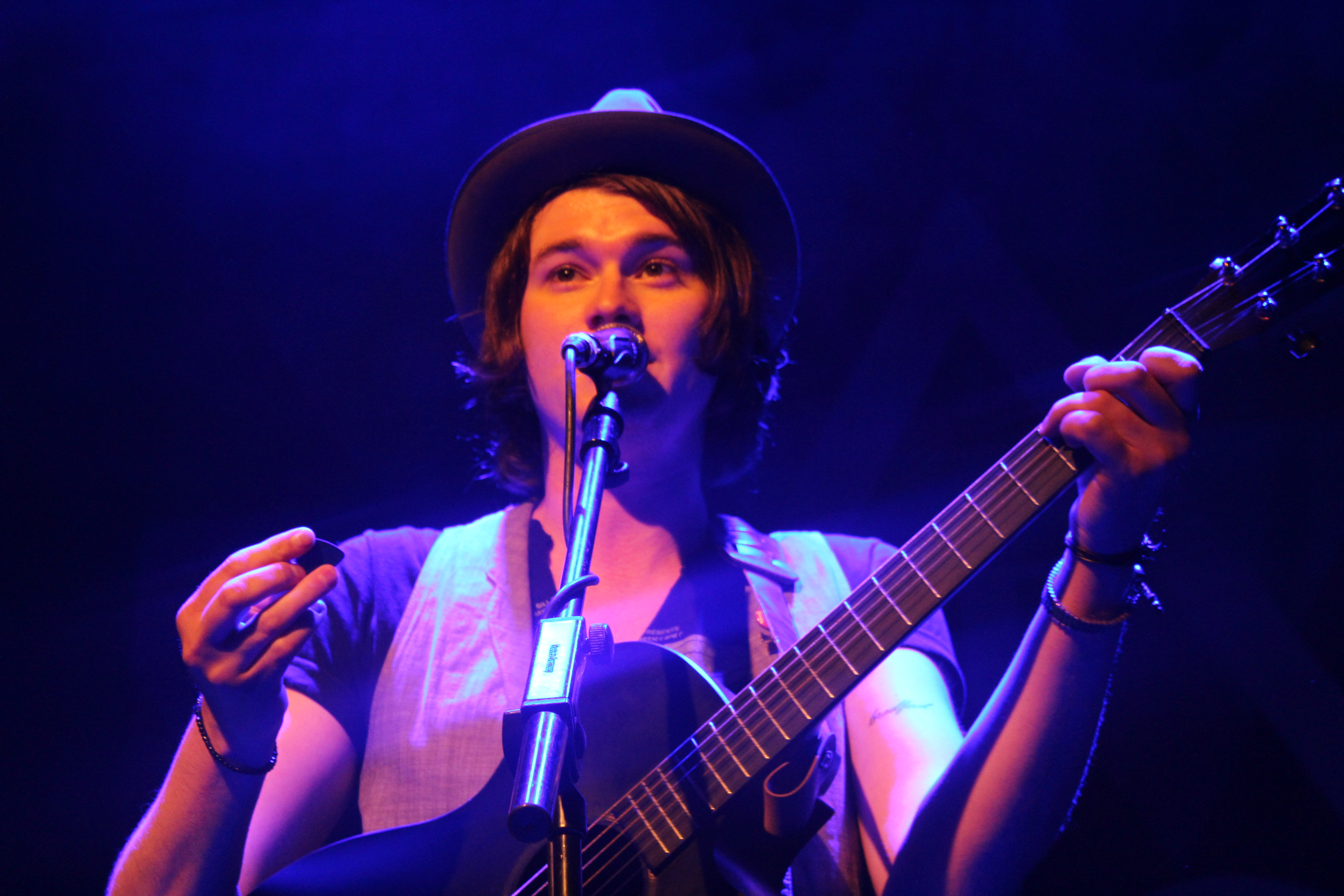
- Beckett in 2014

Background information
- Born: February 11, 1985 (age 41); Hoffman Estates, Illinois
- Origin: Barrington, Illinois, U.S.
- Genres: Alternative rock; pop-punk; indie rock; emo; pop rock; power pop; pop
- Occupations: Singer, songwriter, musician
- Instruments: Vocals, piano, guitar
- Years active: 2003–present
- Labels: Decaydance; Fueled by Ramen; Equal Vision; LAB Records
- Member of: The Academy Is... (2005–2011, 2015, 2022–present)
- Formerly of: Remember Maine
- Spouse: Christine Bandy (m. 2007)

William Beckett (born February 11, 1985) is an American musician who is the lead vocalist and primary lyricist of the Chicago-based rock band The Academy Is..., who signed to Atlantic Records/Fueled by Ramen/Decaydance Records. While still in high school in 2003, Beckett and guitarist Mike Carden came together from rival bands in Chicago to form The Academy Is... In addition to founding the band, Beckett and Carden are credited as the primary songwriters. A third core member of the band was Adam Siska, Beckett's classmate and friend from Barrington High School.

In 2007, Alex Davies from the BBC described Beckett as a mix of Adam Lazzara and Prince, labeling him "utterly captivating".

The Academy Is... reunited at Riot Fest 2015 in Chicago. Although Beckett had said the occasion would serve as a "farewell" show, the band later embarked on an additional final tour later in the year.

== Music ==
Beckett started writing music for his own private pleasure because he did not like the material that was on the radio anymore. He said in an interview that his sister found him playing his songs in the basement and started joining him. She was his first audience and gave him her honest feedback on the material he wrote.

Prior to co-founding The Academy Is... with Mike Carden, Beckett performed in an acoustic band called Remember Maine, releasing the album The Last Place You Look on LLR Recordings when he was 17 years old.

Beckett has also sung on a number of notable albums by other bands, such as the track "Sophomore Slump or Comeback of the Year" from Fall Out Boy's 2005 album, From Under the Cork Tree. He sang backing vocals on Fall Out Boy's "What a Catch, Donnie". Other songs he has sung on include "There's a Class for This" from Cute Is What We Aim For's 2006 album The Same Old Blood Rush with a New Touch, "7 Weeks" from Gym Class Heroes's album As Cruel as School Children, and the Cobra Starship song "Snakes on a Plane (Bring It)," which later appeared on the Snakes on a Plane soundtrack and on Cobra Starship's album While the City Sleeps, We Rule the Streets under the title "Bring It (Snakes on a Plane)".

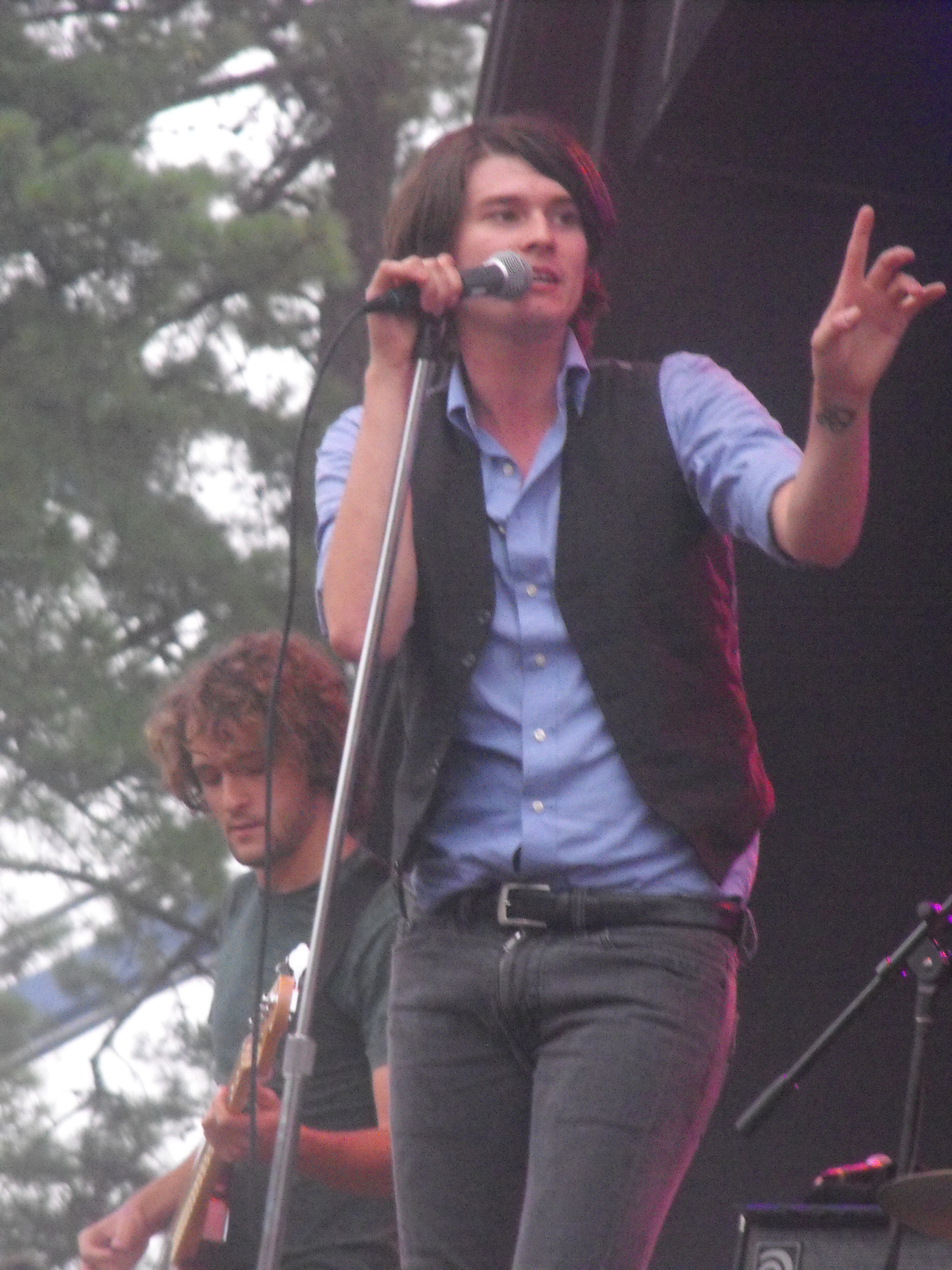
Beckett performing at Six Flags New Jersey in 2009.

Beckett also has a songwriting credit on Hey Monday's song "Homecoming" from their debut album Hold On Tight and on Demi Lovato's song "For the Love of a Daughter" from her third album Unbroken.

After breaking up The Academy Is..., allegedly to start a solo music career (though other reasons such as internal strife within the band were hinted at), he released first EP, Walk the Talk on April 17, 2012, with the single "Compromising Me". His second EP was announced on June 18, 2012, entitled Winds Will Change (produced by Matt Grabe), and was released July 17, 2012, with the main single "Great Night", being released on June 19, 2012. His third EP, What Will Be, was released October 30, 2012. In January 2013, William released a compilation of acoustic covers of his own music, titled The Pioneer Sessions. In February 2013, William signed to Equal Vision Records. Later in 2013, it was announced that William's debut full-length album, titled Genuine and Counterfeit, would be released in August. The first single from the album, "Benny & Joon", was released June 17, 2013. The music video for the same was released July 31.

Beckett played in the Acoustic Basement tent of the 2013 Van's Warped Tour, where he played much of his solo discography and a few The Academy Is... songs.

Beckett's solo album Genuine and Counterfeit was released August 20, 2013, though he leaked it to Alternative Press five days prior. It was met with a generally positive reception from William's fans.

On September 5, 2013, the Punk Goes... album series by Fearless Records released their Punk Goes Christmas album, which featured Beckett's cover of "Do You Hear What I Hear?"

In 2014, Beckett featured on "Wolf in Sheep's Clothing" on Set It Off's album Duality.

== Side projects ==
William Beckett makes a cameo in Fall Out Boy's music video for the song "A Little Less Sixteen Candles, a Little More "Touch Me"" as the lead vampire and in "This Ain't a Scene, It's an Arms Race" music video as the same vampire. He also appears in the music video for "Bring It (Snakes on a Plane)" by Cobra Starship, following his vocal appearance in the song.

According to Us Magazine, he is co-authoring a book with Fall Out Boy's Pete Wentz, who had originally recommended the band to the label Fueled by Ramen.

On April 16, 2009, Beckett posted the first chapter of the book he hopes to have published, entitled The Folding.

Beckett announced via his blog on July 12, 2010 (the post has now been deleted and replaced with an update post) that he would be starring in a short film based on Edgar Allan Poe's The Fall of the House of Usher.

Beckett wrote the theme song for John Scalzi's novel, Lock In, released on August 28, 2014.

== Personal life ==
He has been married to Christine Bandy since May 2007. In a November 2009 interview with Alternative Press, Beckett confirmed that he has a child.

Beckett performed a DJ set at Emo Nite Day, a festival hosted by Emo Nite, in Los Angeles in December 2017. He also appeared with Cobra Starship member Gabe Saporta at Emo Nite in 2023 for a performance of "Snakes on a Plane (Bring It!)".

== Solo discography ==
- Walk the Talk (April 17, 2012)
- Winds Will Change (July 17, 2012)
- What Will Be (October 30, 2012)
- The Pioneer Sessions (January 22, 2013)
- Genuine & Counterfeit (August 20, 2013)

== Guest appearances ==
Year	Song	Work done	Artist(s)	Album
2005	"Sophomore Slump or Comeback of the Year"	Guest vocals	Fall Out Boy	From Under the Cork Tree
2006	"7 Weeks"	Guest vocals	Gym Class Heroes	As Cruel as School Children
2006	"Bring It (Snakes on a Plane)"	Guest vocals	Cobra Starship	While the City Sleeps, We Rule the Streets
2006	"There's a Class for This"	Guest vocals	Cute is What We Aim For	The Same Old Blood Rush with a New Touch
2008	"What a Catch, Donnie"	Guest vocals	Fall Out Boy	Folie à Deux
2008	"Hold On (Remix)"	Guest vocals and remixing	Good Charlotte	Greatest Remixes
2008	"Homecoming"	Writing	Hey Monday	Hold On Tight
2011	"For the Love of a Daughter"	Writing	Demi Lovato	Unbroken
2014	"Wolf in Sheep's Clothing"	Guest vocals	Set It Off	Duality
