= Live at Budokan (2005 film) =

- Directed by: Fran Strine
- Distributed by: Epic Records
- Release date: December 13, 2005
- Running time: 120 minutes

Live at Budokan is a DVD by pop rock singer-songwriter Butch Walker, released on December 13, 2005, by Epic Records. It contains two concerts — a 40-minute full-band set, recorded in Tokyo, Japan during Walker's 2005 tour with Avril Lavigne, and 75-minute acoustic set, recorded in Atlanta, Georgia in 2003.

== Content ==
=== Live at Budokan ===
The DVD's main feature is a concert recorded on Walker's "Bonez Tour" supporting Avril Lavigne at Nippon Budokan in Tokyo, Japan on March 15, 2005. Each song is followed by a documentary interlude of self-shot material by Walker, filmed on the streets of Tokyo and in the venue's backstage area. Just before "I Want You to Want Me" (a Cheap Trick cover version of a song off their 1978 album Cheap Trick at Budokan), there are two rather inaudible bootleg clips of two covers played during the tour of Elvis Costello's "Radio Radio" and Blur's "Song 2".

==== Setlist ====
1. "Radio Tokyo"
2. "Uncomfortably Numb"
3. "#1 Summer Jam"
4. "Last Flight Out"
5. "Mixtape"
6. "Best Thing You Never Had"
7. "I Want You to Want Me" (Cheap Trick cover)
8. "Lights Out"

=== This is me... Justified and Stripped ===
As a bonus, the DVD also features an acoustic concert filmed between the releases of Left of Self-Centered (2002) and Letters (2004). The set includes tracks from both albums, as well as many Marvelous 3 tunes and fractions of cover versions in between songs, including the Carpenters' "Close to You", Maxi Priest's "Close to You", Nelly's "Pimp Juice" and OutKast's "Ms. Jackson". The concert was filmed on June 7, 2003, at the Variety Playhouse in Atlanta, Georgia. Excerpts of it can also be found on Walker's 2004 live album This Is Me... Justified and Stripped.

==== Setlist ====
1. "Sober"
2. "Promise"
3. "Race Cars and Goth Rock"
4. "Diary of a San Fernando Sexx Star"
5. "Mixtape"
6. "Don't Move"
7. "Best Thing You Never Had"
8. "Cigarette Lighter Love Song" (Marvelous 3 original)
9. "Suburbia"
10. "Bohemian Rhapsody" (Queen cover)
11. "Grant Park" (Marvelous 3 original)
12. "Over Your Head" (Marvelous 3 original)
13. "Every Monday" (Marvelous 3 original)
14. "Freak of the Week" (Marvelous 3 original)
15. "Let Me Go" (Marvelous 3 original)
16. "Take Tomorrow (One Day at a Time)"

== Personnel ==
- Michael Guy Chislett – guitar, piano
- Kenny Cresswell – drums
- Darren Dodd – drums
- Jayce Fincher – bass
- JT Hall – bass
- Mitch "Slug" McLee – drums
- Butch Walker – vocals, guitar, piano
