= Under Control =

Under Control may refer to:

- Under Control (album), a 2010 album by Cary Brothers
- "Under Control" (Calvin Harris and Alesso song), 2013
- Under Control (film), a 1999 Hong Kong film starring Jackie Chan, originally released under the title Gorgeous
- "Under Control" (Parachute song), 2009
- "Under Control" (The Vampire Diaries), a 2010 episode of the television series The Vampire Diaries
- "Under Control", a song by Ellie Goulding from the album Halcyon Days
- "Under Control", a song by The Internet from the album Ego Death
- "Under Control", a song by Plastiscines from the album LP1
- "Under Control", a song by Rage from the album End of All Days
- "Under Control", a song by The Strokes from the album Room on Fire
- "Under Control", a song by Tom Pearman
