= Butch Walker =

American musician (born 1969)

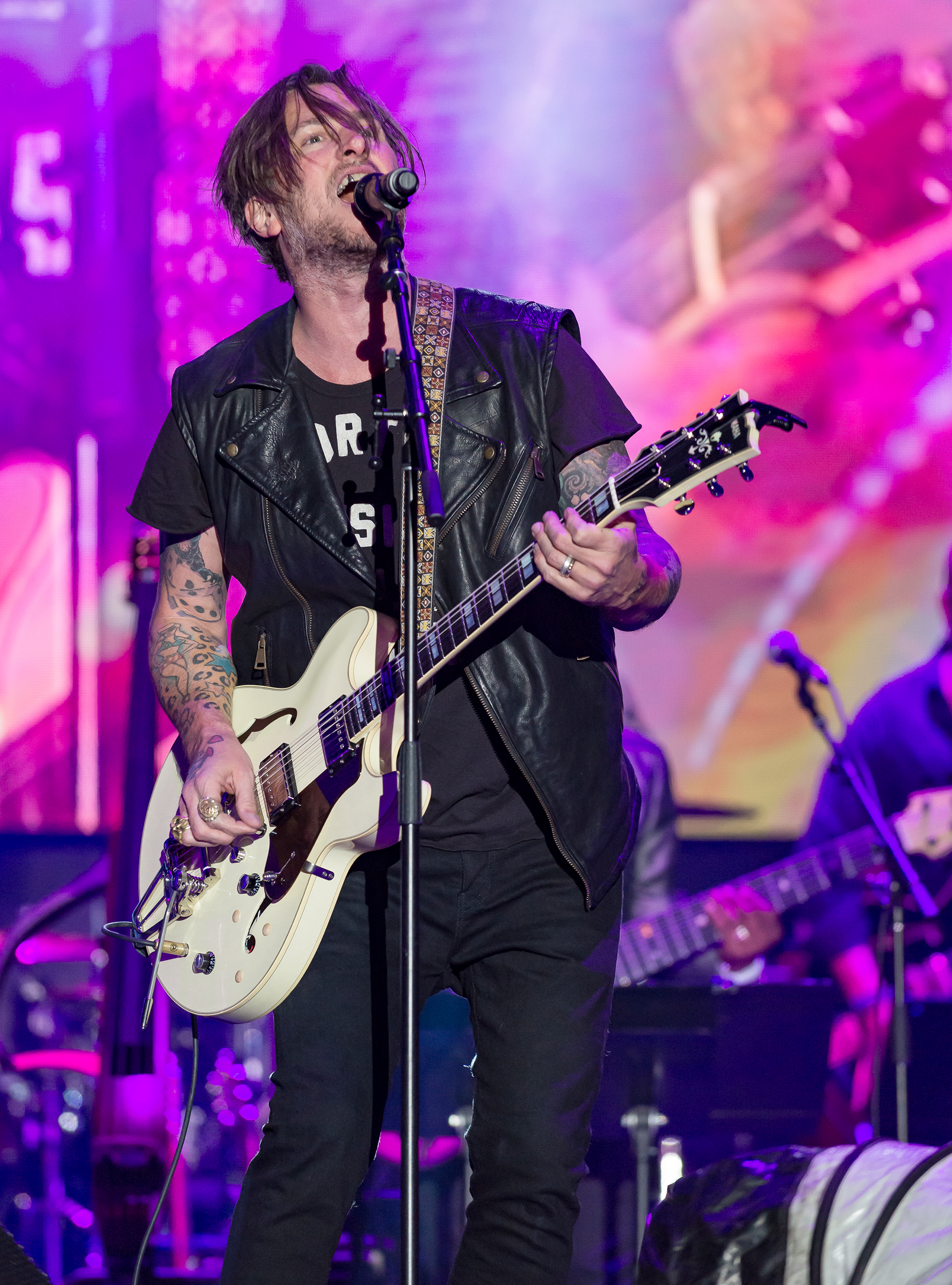
- Walker performing in 2018

Background information
- Born: Bradley Glenn Walker; November 14, 1969 (age 56); Rome, Georgia, U.S.
- Genres: Glam metal; hard rock; pop-punk
- Occupations: Singer-songwriter; musician; record producer
- Instruments: Vocals; guitar
- Years active: 1985–present
- Labels: Dangerbird; Original Signal; Lojinx; MapleMusic (Canada); One Haven Music
- Member of: Train; Marvelous 3
- Formerly of: SouthGang; The Floyds
- Website: butchwalker.com

Signature
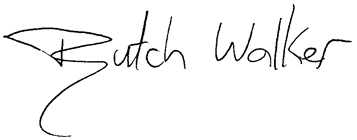

Bradley Glenn "Butch" Walker (born November 14, 1969) is an American singer-songwriter, musician, and record producer. He is the current lead guitarist for Train since 2025. He was lead guitarist for the glam metal band SouthGang from the late 1980s to early 1990s. From 1997 to 2001, he became the lead vocalist and guitarist for the rock band Marvelous 3.

== Career ==
=== SouthGang ===
Walker grew up in Cartersville, Georgia, working as a guitarist and performer in several rock bands during the 1980s, including Bad Boys and Byte the Bullet. In 1988, Byte the Bullet moved to Los Angeles, and within a year, was signed to Virgin Records. The band then changed its name to SouthGang and released two albums, Tainted Angel in 1991 and Group Therapy in 1992. SouthGang was one of the first bands to tour China in the early 1990s. Following modifications to their record contract, they disbanded, but remained on good terms.

=== Floyd's Funk Revival ===
After SouthGang disbanded, Walker formed a new band with former SouthGang members Jayce Fincher and Mitch "Slug" McLee (also known as Doug Mitchell), along with keyboardist Bradford Rogers, calling themselves "Floyd's Funk Revival" after Walker's birthplace, Floyd County, Georgia. Walker shared lead vocals in the band with Fincher's wife, Chrystina Lloree. They released one full-length album, Creamy, containing thirteen original tracks.

The band then shortened their name to The Floyds. Subsequently, they released one self-titled album on the Deep South label, which contained ten original tracks and two bonus tracks. Bonus tracks included a cover of Duran Duran's "Rio", and a live rendition of the Shasta soda jingle from the late seventies.

=== Marvelous 3 ===
In 1997 Walker, Fincher, and McLee scaled back to a trio and adopted a power pop sound with Walker handling lead vocals. Calling themselves Marvelous 3, they released the album Math and Other Problems in 1997. They followed this in 1999 with Hey! Album and had a minor hit with the song "Freak of the Week". The next year, they released their final album, ReadySexGo, which failed to continue the momentum created by the prior releases. The band disbanded in 2001. Their final concert took place on August 3, 2001, at Atlanta's Centennial Olympic Park.

On April 25, 2023, Walker announced on Atlanta's 99X that the band was getting back together for a new album, a re-release of "Hey Album," and a show on October 27, 2023, at the Tabernacle in Atlanta. The new album, titled IV was released on October 13, 2023.

=== Train ===
Beginning in June 2025, Walker replaced Train's guitarist Taylor Locke beginning with the 2025 Europe tour and the 2025 North American summer tour. On November 10, 2025 along with the announcement of Train's 2026 North American summer tour, it was announced that Walker joined Train as a permanent member. Walker has previously produced albums and co-wrote songs with Train.

=== Solo ===
Walker's solo career began with the release of his albums Left of Self-Centered in 2002, Letters in 2004 and The Rise and Fall of Butch Walker and the Let's-Go-Out-Tonites in 2006. In 2005 he played over 200 live shows across both the U.S. and Japan, and he released his first DVD, Live at Budokan. Walker was featured as a headlining artist on the inaugural Hotel Cafe tour, supporting independent artists from the Los Angeles venue of the same name.

In 2008, Walker released the live album Leavin' the Game on Luckie Street. He then collaborated with Michael Chislett of The Academy Is... and Darren Dodd of The Let's Go Out Tonites under the name 1969, releasing a full-length debut album titled Maya on April 1, 2008.

His fourth album, Sycamore Meadows, was released on November 11, 2008, with the first single being "The Weight of Her". A music video was released for the song "Ships in a Bottle", featuring Walker walking on the grounds of his home on Sycamore Meadows Drive in Southern California after it was destroyed by the wildfires of November 2007. Both Maya and Sycamore Meadows were released on limited runs of vinyl.

Walker played a series of sold-out acoustic live shows beginning in the fall of 2009, accompanied at various times by Pink, actor Jeremy Piven, Jim Bianco, the Chapin Sisters, Gregory Macdonald of Sloan (band) and more. Out of the shows came a cover of Taylor Swift's single "You Belong with Me" on banjolin, which was later recorded as a video and audio version in his studio. Swift blogged about the video and then invited Walker to appear with her at the winter 2010 Grammy Awards.

Walker began working on his next album in 2009, and ultimately released I Liked It Better When You Had No Heart on February 23, 2010, under the band name Butch Walker & the Black Widows. Recording sessions were held at Ruby-Red Productions in Santa Monica, California. Walker's support of the record included touring with Train beginning in March 2010, a headlining tour of the US, and opening for P!nk in Europe on her Stadium Festival Tour.

On August 30, 2011, Walker released his second album with the Black Widows, titled The Spade. On October 25, 2011, Walker released his first book, an autobiography entitled Drinking with Strangers: Music Lessons from a Teenage Bullet Belt. In late 2012, Walker was featured on the show Live from Daryl's House on MTV Live (then Palladia).

Following the release of two EPs in 2013 and 2014, Walker released his seventh full-length album, Afraid of Ghosts, on February 3, 2015. The album was produced by Ryan Adams.

In June 2016 it was announced that Walker's upcoming album would be titled Stay Gold. It was released on August 26, 2016, on Dangerbird Records in the United States and on Lojinx in Europe. The album is once again self-produced by Walker, with the songs "Stay Gold", "East Coast Girl" and "Descending" (featuring Ashley Monroe) issued before the album's release.

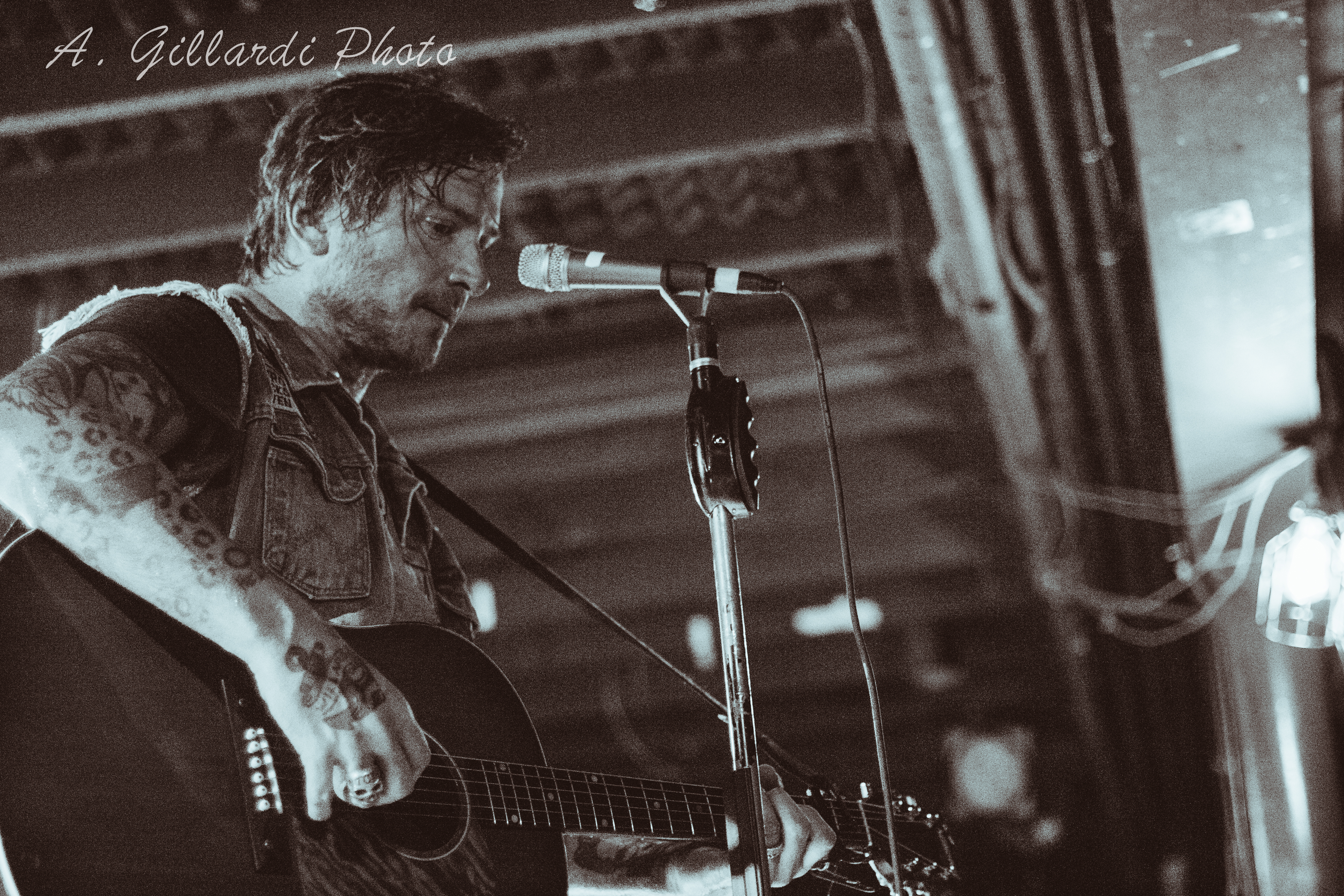
Walker performing live in 2014.

On March 27, 2020, Walker premiered the first promo track for his upcoming album named American Love Story, which was set to be released on May 8. The song "Pretty Crazy" was released on social media and streaming services.

On July 25, 2022, Walker released the music video for "Holy Water Hangover" off his then upcoming tenth studio album Butch Walker as...Glenn. The album was released on August 26 of the same year.

== Productions and collaborations ==
Walker has penned choruses for artists ranging from Frank Turner to Fall Out Boy. He has produced and composed multiple Pink records and songs including "Leave Me Alone (I'm Lonely)" from I'm Not Dead, "Bad Influence" from Funhouse, and "Heartbreak Down" from Greatest Hits... So Far!!!

In 2019 he co-produced Green Day's Father of All Motherfuckers, which debuted at number four on the US Billboard 200.

Walker worked with Weezer on their albums Raditude and Pacific Daydream. Walker was mentioned working with the band during a radio interview with 99X. Walker co-wrote and produced several songs on Raditude, including the first single, "(If You're Wondering If I Want You To) I Want You To", which hit number two on the Modern Rock Chart.

In 2007, Walker provided guest vocals on Fall Out Boy's third record Infinity on High, on the track, "You're Crashing, but You're No Wave", and co-produced the track "Don't You Know Who I Think I Am?" with singer Patrick Stump. He also made a brief cameo in the video for "This Ain't A Scene, It's An Arms Race". In 2012, Walker produced Fall Out Boy's fifth studio album Save Rock and Roll, which debuted at number one on the U.S. Billboard 200, earning the band's second career number one.

In 2010, Walker also helped to write and produce Panic! At The Disco's album, Vices & Virtues. Preceded by the lead single, "The Ballad of Mona Lisa", the album debuted at number seven on the Billboard 200 selling 56,000 copies within its first week. The album has sold 750,000 copies worldwide.

Walker also appears in The Academy Is... videos for "Slow Down" and "We've Got a Big Mess on Our Hands" as well as the video for "So What" by Pink. He also co-wrote the songs "Breaking" and "Younglife", both of which are performed and co-written by Anberlin.

In January 2009, post-hardcore band Saosin tapped Walker to produce their second album for Capitol Records.

In March 2009, the song "Open Happiness" debuted, a new business venture by Coca-Cola, written by Walker and featuring Cee-Lo Green, Brendon Urie, Patrick Stump, Janelle Monáe and Travis McCoy. This song has a Cantonese cover version by Joey Yung on her new album, A Time For Us, and she is also filming advertisements for Coca-Cola in Chinese.

In 2012, Walker produced the song "Everything Has Changed", written and recorded by Taylor Swift and Ed Sheeran for Swift's fourth studio album, Red. In 2021, Walker produced the re-recorded version of the song for Swift's second re-recorded album, Red (Taylor's Version).

In 2022, Walker produced the song "August is Falling" by pop-punk band August is Falling, featured on the EP The Simple Plan.

Other artists that Walker has co-written songs with include SR-71, Avril Lavigne, Sevendust, Injected, The Donnas, Hot Hot Heat, American Hi-Fi, Default, Gob, Midtown, Puffy AmiYumi, Pink, Katy Perry, Pete Yorn, Quietdrive, Green Day, Adam Lambert, Rob Thomas of Matchbox 20, Rayland Baxter, Kevin Griffin of Better Than Ezra, The Wallflowers, Jewel, The All-American Rejects, The Academy Is..., The Cab, Saosin, Never Shout Never, Weezer, New Politics, Fall Out Boy, The Struts, Andrew McMahon in the Wilderness, August is Falling, Matt Nathanson, and Elizabeth Cook.

Walker is producing Courtney Love's forthcoming album.

Walker produced "Not Bad for New Jersey" and "Better Before" for Brian Fallon in 2026.

== Documentary ==
The documentary Out of Focus premiered at the Nashville Film Festival in April 2012. Directed by Shane Valdés and Peter Harding, it focuses on Butch Walker's life and music. Its first European showing was at Oldenburg Filmfest, Germany in August 2012.

== Personal life ==
In November 2007, Walker's home in Malibu, California was destroyed in a wildfire. Walker had been renting the property from Flea of the Red Hot Chili Peppers. He and his family lost all of their possessions, including the master recordings of every song he had ever recorded. He titled his next album Sycamore Meadows after the street the house was on.

He currently lives in Nashville, Tennessee, with his wife and son.

In October 2026, Walker was accused of sexual misconduct with an underage girl, who alleged that Walker began a 10-year relationship with her in 2001 when she was 15 and he was 31.

== Discography ==
=== Studio albums ===
Year	Album details	Peak chart positions		
Year	Album details	US	US Heat	JP
2002	Left of Self-Centered	—	12	—
2004	Letters	171	10	137
2006	The Rise and Fall of Butch Walker and the Let's-Go-Out-Tonites	140	2	294
2008	Sycamore Meadows	173	7	—
2010	I Liked It Better When You Had No Heart	125	1	—
2011	The Spade	105	1	—
2015	Afraid of Ghosts	104	1	—
2016	Stay Gold	143	2	—
2020	American Love Story	—	—	—
2022	Butch Walker as... Glenn	—	—	—
"—" denotes albums that did not chart or were not released in that territory.

=== Live and other albums ===
- This Is Me... Justified and Stripped (2004)
- Acoustic: Live In Atlanta (2005)
- Leavin' the Game on Luckie Street (2008)
- Over the Holidays and Under the Influence (2017) No. 20 Heatseekers
- American Love Story: Live & Quarantined (2021)

=== EPs ===
- Heartwork (2004)
- Cover Me Badd (2005)
- Live at Lollapalooza 2008 (2008)
- Here Comes The... EP (2009)
- Peachtree Battle (2013) No. 127 US, No. 3 Heatseekers
- End of the World (One More Time) / Battle vs. The War (2014)
- Cassette Backs (2016)

=== Singles ===
- "Merry Christmas" (2004)
- "You Belong with Me" (2009)
- "Better Now" (2018)
- "Eye of the Tiger" (2019)
- "Holy Water Hangover" (2022)
- "Walkin' Back to Georgia" with Elizabeth Cook & Katie Pruitt (2022)
- "Straight to Hell" duet with Elizabeth Cook (from 'Let's Go Dancing' the Songs of Kevn Kinney) feat. Jeff Sullivan (2024)
- "Angel" duet with Ashley Monroe (2024)
- "Blue Christmas" duet with Cyrena Wages (2024)

=== DVDs ===
- This Is Me... Justified and Stripped (2003)
- Live at Budokan (2005)
- Leavin' the Game on Luckie Street (2008)
- Butch Walker: Out of Focus (2013)

=== Book ===
- Drinking with Strangers: Music Lessons from a Teenage Bullet Belt (2011)

=== Featured in ===
- One Tree Hill soundtrack album by various artists (2005)
- "You're Crashing, But You're No Wave" by Fall Out Boy (2007)
- "Christmas All Over Again" duet with Taryn Manning (2008)
- "Good Times" by Tommy Lee (2005)
- "One Night in New York" by The Whiskey Gentry (2013)
- "Better Than That" by Suzanne Santo (2017)
- "I'm Not In Love" by The Dove & the Wolf (2018)
- "Clock Work" by Asian Kung-Fu Generation (2018)
- "Almost Happy" by LACES (2021)
- "Two Timin'" by The Watson Twins (2022)
- "I Got You Babe" duet with Nicki Bluhm (2023)

=== As a producer ===
- Marvelous 3 – Math and Other Problems (1997)
- Marvelous 3 – Hey! Album (1998)
- Me, Myself & Irene (Music from the Motion Picture) (2000)
- SR-71 – Now You See Inside – "Right Now" (2000)
- Marvelous 3 – ReadySexGo (2000)
- More Fast and Furious: Music from and Inspired by the Motion Picture The Fast and the Furious (2001)
- WWF Tough Enough 2 (2002)
- Injected – Burn It Black (2002)
- Bowling for Soup – Drunk Enough to Dance (2002)
- Butch Walker – Left of Self-Centered (2002)
- Stroke 9 – Rip It Off (2002)
- Spider-Man: Music from and Inspired By (2002)
- The Hot Chick (Soundtrack) (2002)
- The Scorpion King (Soundtrack) (2002)
- SR-71 – Tomorrow (2002)
- Pete Yorn – Day I Forgot (2003)
- Agent Cody Banks (Soundtrack) (2003)
- MTV2 Headbangers Ball (2003)
- A Santa Cause: It's a Punk Rock Christmas (2003)
- Default – Elocation (2003)
- Ike – Parallel Universe (2003)
- Mars Needs Women – Red Means Go (2003)
- Sevendust – Seasons (2003)
- Bowling for Soup – A Hangover You Don't Deserve (2004)
- Midtown – Forget What You Know (2004)
- The Donnas – Gold Medal (2004)
- Butch Walker – Letters (2004)
- Scooby-Doo 2: Monsters Unleashed (Soundtrack) (2004)
- Spider-Man 2 (Original Soundtrack) (2004)
- Avril Lavigne – Under My Skin (2004)
- Lindsay Lohan – A Little More Personal (Raw) (2005)
- A Lot Like Love (Music from the Motion Picture) (2005)
- One Tree Hill – Music from the WB Television Series, Vol. 1 (2005)
- Bowling for Soup – Bowling for Soup Goes to the Movies (2005)
- Sevendust – Best Of (Chapter One 1997–2004) (2005)
- Substitution Mass Confusion: A Tribute to The Cars (2005)
- Elektra: The Album (Original Soundtrack) (2005)
- American Hi-Fi – Hearts on Parade (2005)
- Wakefield – Which Side Are You On? (2005)
- Family Force 5 – Business Up Front/Party in the Back (2006)
- Butch Walker – Cover Me Badd (2006)
- Happy Feet: Music from the Motion Picture (2006)
- Pink – I'm Not Dead (2006)
- Rock Star Supernova – Rock Star Supernova (2006)
- Friends with Benefit: Music from the Television Series One Tree Hill, Volume 2 (2006)
- Sound of Superman (2006)
- Puffy AmiYumi – Splurge (2006)
- The Bronx – The Bronx (2006)
- Bowling for Soup – The Great Burrito Extortion Case (2006)
- Butch Walker – The Rise and Fall of Butch Walker and the Let's-Go-Out-Tonites (2006)
- Quietdrive – When All That's Left Is You (2006)
- Pete Yorn – Nightcrawler (2006)
- Hot Hot Heat – Happiness Ltd. (2007)
- Fall Out Boy – Infinity on High – "Don't You Know Who I Think I Am?" (2007)
- Instant Karma: The Amnesty International Campaign to Save Darfur – "Imagine" [Avril Lavigne] (2007)
- P.S. I Love You (Original Motion Picture Soundtrack) (2007)
- The Hills: The Soundtrack (2007)
- Standing on the Outside: The Songs of Cold Chisel (2007)
- Puffy AmiYumi – Honeycreeper (2007)
- The Academy Is... – Santi (2007)
- The Honorary Title – Scream & Light Up the Sky (2007)
- Avril Lavigne – The Best Damn Thing (2007)
- Secondhand Serenade – A Twist in My Story (2008)
- Pink – Funhouse (2008)
- Katy Perry – One of the Boys (2008)
- Butch Walker – Sycamore Meadows (2008)
- The Automatic – This Is a Fix (2008)
- Plastiscines – About Love (2009)
- Dashboard Confessional – Alter the Ending (2009)
- The Films – Oh, Scorpio! (2009)
- Saosin – In Search of Solid Ground (2009)
- Puffy AmiYumi – Bring It! (2009)
- The Von Bondies – Love, Hate and Then There's You (2009)
- Hot Chelle Rae – Lovesick Electric (2009)
- All Time Low – Nothing Personal (2009)
- Weezer – Raditude (2009)
- Train – Save Me, San Francisco (2009)
- Almost Alice (Music Inspired by the Motion Picture) (2010)
- Hey Monday – Beneath It All – "Hangover" (2010)
- The Maine – Black & White (2010)
- Butch Walker & The Black Widows – I Liked It Better When You Had No Heart (2010)
- Ida Maria – Katla (2010)
- Mishka – Talk About (2010)
- Never Shout Never – What Is Love? (2010)
- All Time Low – Dirty Work (2011)
- Avril Lavigne – Goodbye Lullaby (2011)
- Gin Wigmore – Gravel & Wine (2011)
- Happy Feet Two (Original Motion Picture Soundtrack) (2011)
- Gavin DeGraw – Sweeter (2011)
- Eulogies – Tear the Fences Down (2011)
- Butch Walker & The Black Widows – The Spade (2011)
- The Wombats – This Modern Glitch (2011)
- Panic! at the Disco – Vices & Virtues (2011)
- Train – California 37 (2012)
- Taylor Swift – Red (2012)
- Pink – The Truth About Love (2012)
- Lit – The View from the Bottom (2012)
- Big B – Fool's Gold (2013)
- Keith Urban – Fuse – "Even the Stars Fall 4 U" (2013)
- Gavin DeGraw – Make a Move (2013)
- Butch Walker – Peachtree Battle (2013)
- Fall Out Boy – Save Rock and Roll (2013)
- Panic! at the Disco – Too Weird to Live, Too Rare to Die! (2013)
- Big Hero 6 (Original Motion Picture Soundtrack) (2014)
- Train – Bulletproof Picasso (2014)
- Christina Perri – Head or Heart (2014)
- Butch Walker – Afraid of Ghosts (2015)
- Fall Out Boy – American Beauty/American Psycho (2015)
- Frank Turner – Positive Songs for Negative People (2015)
- Marc Scibilia – Out of Style – EP (2015)
- Harry Connick Jr. – That Would Be Me (2015)
- Brian Fallon – Painkillers (2016)
- Gavin DeGraw – Something Worth Saving (2016)
- Butch Walker – Stay Gold (2016)
- Suicide Squad: The Album – "Bohemian Rhapsody" [Panic! at the Disco] (2016)
- Carly Rae Jepsen – "Everywhere You Look" (single) (2016)
- Suzanne Santo – Ruby Red (2017)
- MisterWives – Connect the Dots (2017)
- New Politics – Lost in Translation (2017)
- Weezer – Pacific Daydream (2017)
- Fall Out Boy – M A N I A (2018)
- Matt Nathanson – Sings His Sad Heart (2018)
- Andrew McMahon – Upside Down Flowers (2018)
- The Aces – When My Heart Felt Volcanic (2018)
- Rayland Baxter – Wide Awake (2018)
- The Struts – Young & Dangerous (2018)
- Peanut Butter Falcon (Original Motion Picture Soundtrack) (2019)
- Rob Thomas – Chip Tooth Smile (2019)
- Green Day – Father of All Motherfuckers (2020)
- Adam Lambert – Velvet (2020)
- Butch Walker – American Love Story (2020)
- Elizabeth Cook – Aftermath (2020)
- The Wallflowers – Exit Wounds (2021)
- Taylor Swift – Red (Taylor's Version) (2021)
- Billy Idol – The Roadside (2021)
- Train – AM Gold (2022)
- Jewel – Freewheelin' Woman (2022)
- Rayland Baxter – If I Were a Butterfly (2022)
- August is Falling – The Simple Plan EP (2022)
- Billy Idol – The Cage EP (2022)
- Panic! at the Disco – Viva Las Vengeance (2022)
- Butch Walker – Butch Walker as... Glenn (2023)
- The Watson Twins – HOLLER (2023)
- Bethany Cosentino – Natural Disaster (2023)
- Marvelous 3 – IV (2023)
- Courtney Love - Antiheroine (2026)
- Train - Mad Dog In The Fog (2026)
- Brian Fallon - "Not Bad for New Jersey" and "Better Before" (2026)

Category:Song recordings produced by Butch Walker ( 57 )
