= I Liked It Better When You Had No Heart =

Studio album by Butch Walker
- Released: February 2, 2010
- Genres: Alternative rock, pop rock
- Length: 40:03
- Label: One Haven Music
- Producer: Butch Walker

Butch Walker chronology
Here Comes The... (2009)	I Liked It Better When You Had No Heart (2010)	The Spade (2011)

I Liked It Better When You Had No Heart is the fifth full-length studio album by Butch Walker, and the first released under the name Butch Walker and the Black Widows. On January 5, 2010, Walker released "Trash Day" as the first single, backed with the track "She Likes Hair Bands". The complete track list was made available on Butch's website in February 2010. The vinyl release was February 2, 2010, with the CD/digital release following on February 23, 2010. The album landed at #1 on the Billboard Heatseekers chart and #125 on the Billboard Hot 200.

A music video was shot for "Pretty Melody" and the video got considerable exposure when it became a featured video on YouTube. All songs were either written by Walker himself or co-written by Walker and Michael Trent, with the exception of "You Belong With Me," a bonus track made available through selected outlets when pre-ordered.

"You Belong with Me" is a Taylor Swift cover from her 2008 album Fearless. The popularity of Walker's version of the song increased significantly when Swift herself tweeted favorably about it. Walker was later invited to perform the song with her live at the Grammy awards. Walker's version of the song was sold digitally as a single before being offered as a bonus track on this album. All the bonus tracks on I Liked It Better When You Had No Heart were digital bonuses and not on the physical CD itself.

== Track listing ==
Professional ratings
Aggregate scores
Source	Rating
Metacritic	80/100
Review scores
Source	Rating
AbsolutePunk.net	(95%)
BLARE Magazine	4/5 stars
Slant Magazine	(3.0/5)
Sputnikmusic	(3.5/5)
The Tune	(4.0/5)

All tracks are written by Butch Walker and Michael Trent, except where noted.

No.	Title	Length
1.	"Trash Day" (Walker)	3:07
2.	"Pretty Melody"	4:22
3.	"Don't You Think Someone Should Take You Home"	4:37
4.	"Stripped Down Version"	3:32
5.	"Canadian Ten" (Walker)	4:27
6.	"Temporary Title" (Walker)	3:13
7.	"She Likes Hair Bands" (Walker)	2:58
8.	"House of Cards"	2:30
9.	"They Don't Know What We Know"	3:45
10.	"Days/Months/Years"	3:14
11.	"Be Good Until Then" (Walker)	4:06
Total length:		40:03

Japanese edition bonus track
No.	Title	Length
12.	"Fixed Gears and Broken Hearts"	2:37
13.	"You Belong with Me"	4:10
Total length:		46:51

Bonus tracks
No.	Title	Length
12.	"Xmas in April" (iTunes pre-order bonus track)	1:39
13.	"Fixed Gears and Broken Hearts" (iTunes bonus track)	2:37
14.	"You Belong With Me" (Pre-order bonus track)	4:10

== Personnel ==
- Butch Walker - lead vocals, acoustic & electric guitars, piano
- Fran Capitanelli - guitars
- Chris Unck - guitars, lap steel
- Jake Sinclair - bass guitar
- Wesley Flowers - keyboards
- Darren Dodd - drums, percussion
