= Injected (band) =

American rock band

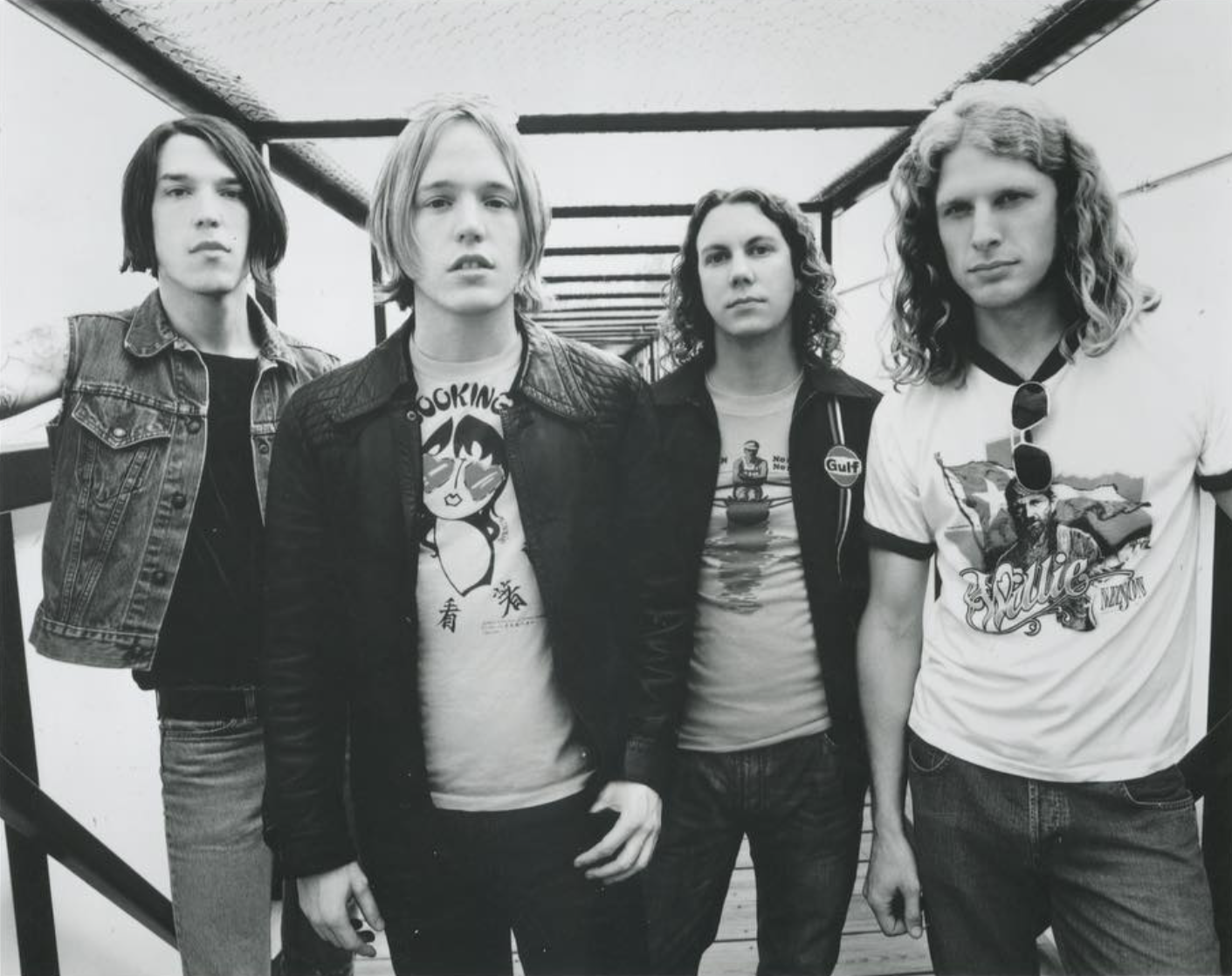
- Injected in 2001

Background information
- Origin: Atlanta, Georgia, U.S.
- Genres: Alternative metal; hard rock; post-grunge
- Years active: 1995–2005; 2009; 2012
- Label: Island
- Past members: Danny Grady; Jade Lemons; Matt Pruitt; Steve Slovisky; Chris Wojtal

Injected was an American hard rock band from Atlanta, Georgia. Active from 1995 to 2005 and for brief periods until 2016, the band released two full-length LPs: 2002's Burn It Black and 2017's The Truth About You.

Influenced by groups such as Quicksand, Helmet and Mötley Crüe, the band was known for their raucous live performances as well as their melody and songwriting.

The band's major label debut, Burn It Black, was critically acclaimed, with Metallica's Lars Ulrich nominating it for the Shortlist Prize in 2002, as well as appearing on Eddie Trunk's year-end top 10 list for 2002.

== History ==
=== Formation and early years ===
The band was formed in 1995 by high school friends Danny Grady (lead vocals/guitar), Chris Wojtal (drums), and Steve Slovisky (bass) in Atlanta. In 1996 they released their first full length CD, Hammered and Enamored. Lead guitarist Jade Lemons would join the band soon after, as the band also moonlit as an 1980s cover band, "Airbrush Johnson."

In 1999, as the band amassed buzz in the Atlanta music scene, lead vocalist Danny Grady approached Marvelous 3 vocalist Butch Walker to produce new material for another independent release. The subsequent material, recorded at Walker's Ruby Red Studios, would end up on the band's major label debut.

=== Burn It Black ===
In 2000 the band signed with Island/Def Jam records. The band relocated to Bearsville Studios in upstate New York to record the remainder of Burn It Black. The album was mixed by Rich Costey (Audioslave, Muse, Cave In) at Larribee East.

During the promotional tour for their debut, the band toured with Oleander, Local H,Fu Manchu, and Marvelous 3. The band would also join the MTV Campus Invasion tour in 2002. Guitarist Jade Lemons would leave the band in 2002.

Songs from the album would appear on several movie soundtracks: Spider-Man: Music from and Inspired By Original Motion Picture Soundtrack, The Scorpion King and More Fast and Furious.

=== Follow up to Burn It Black ===
After completing their debut tour, the band enlisted producer and engineer Nick DiDia to produce their sophomore major-label album. During the recording of the album, almost all of the executive team that had signed the band left Island/Def Jam, including label head Lyor Cohen. The second album was never released by Island Records and the label and band would eventually break up.

=== Hiatus ===
Though the band's second album did not release on time, songs written for it would be used in major-label releases. Butch Walker's second solo album Letters included "So At Last," written by lead vocalist Danny Grady. American Idol winner and Injected fan David Cook included the track "Barbasol" on his self-titled debut album. The song was released as a single in March 2009 as a double-A side with "Come Back To Me".

=== Reunions ===
The original members, including lead guitarist Jade Lemons, would reunite for a final time in 2009, playing the charity event 500 Songs For Kids. Lemons and Grady would reunite once more in 2012, playing an acoustic set at Eddie's Attic.

In April 2016 guitarist Jade Lemons died.

=== The Truth About You ===
After guitarist Jade Lemons passing, vocalist Danny Grady decided to release the final material featuring both of them. Grady had re-recorded The Truth About You with drummer Kyle Spence (of Harvey Milk, Kurt Vile, Dinosaur Jr.) at Spence's studio in Athens, GA and featured Lemons on many of the tracks.

== Band members ==
- Danny Grady – vocals, guitar (1995–2005, 2009, 2012)
- Steve Slovisky – bass (1995–2005, 2009)
- Chris Wojtal – drums (1995–2005, 2009)
- Jade Lemons – guitar, vocals (1995–2002, 2009, 2012; died 2016)
- Matt Pruitt – guitar (2002–2005)

== Discography ==
=== Studio albums ===
- Burn It Black (2002) (No. 149 Billboard 200, No. 7 Top Heatseekers)
- The Truth About You (2017)

=== Singles ===
Year	Title	Peak Positions		Album
Year	Title	U.S. Alt.	U.S. Main.	Album
2002	"Faithless"	22	19	Burn It Black
2002	"Bullet"	—	32	Burn It Black

=== Soundtracks ===
- WWF Tough Enough 2 – song: "Faithless"
- Music from and Inspired by Spider-Man – song: "I-IV-V"
- The Scorpion King – song: "Burn It Black"
- 99Xmas Soundtrack Volume II – song: Christmas ("Baby Please Come Home") (U2 cover)
- Fast and the Furious – song: "Faithless"
- Project Gotham Racing 2 – song: "Burn It Black"
