= Stay Gold =

Stay Gold may refer to:

== Music ==
=== Albums ===
- Stay Gold (Butch Walker album) or the title song, 2016
- Stay Gold (CNBLUE album), 2017
- Stay Gold (First Aid Kit album) or the title song, 2014
- Stay Gold, by Ozark Henry, 2013
- Stay Gold, by Pony Up, 2009

=== Songs ===
- "Stay Gold" (BTS song), by BTS from Map of the Soul: 7 – The Journey (2020)
- "Stay Gold" (Hikaru Utada song), by Hikaru Utada from Heart Station (2008)
- "Stay Gold", by the Apples in Stereo from The Discovery of a World Inside the Moone (2000)
- "Stay Gold", by Aqua Timez
- "Stay Gold", by the Big Pink from Future This (2012)
- "Stay Gold", by Gacharic Spin from Generation Gap (2017)
- "Stay Gold", by Momoiro Clover Z
- "Stay Gold", by Pvris from Use Me (2020)
- "Stay Gold", by Run the Jewels from Run the Jewels 3 (2016)
- "Stay Gold", by Stevie Wonder from the 1983 film The Outsiders

== Other uses ==
- Stay Gold (horse) (1994–2015), a Japanese Thoroughbred racehorse

== See also ==
- "Stay gold, Ponyboy", a phrase from coming-of-age novel The Outsiders by S.E. Hinton
