= LP1 =

LP1 may refer to:

- American Football (1999 album), known retrospectively as "LP1"
- LP1 (FKA Twigs album), 2014
- LP1 (Joss Stone album), 2011
- LP1 (Liam Payne album), 2019
- LP1 (Plastiscines album), 2007
- LP-1, a rocket engine made by Vector Launch
