= Tabernacle (concert hall) =

Concert hall in Atlanta, Georgia, United States

Coordinates: 33.75874°N 84.39139°W

The Tabernacle
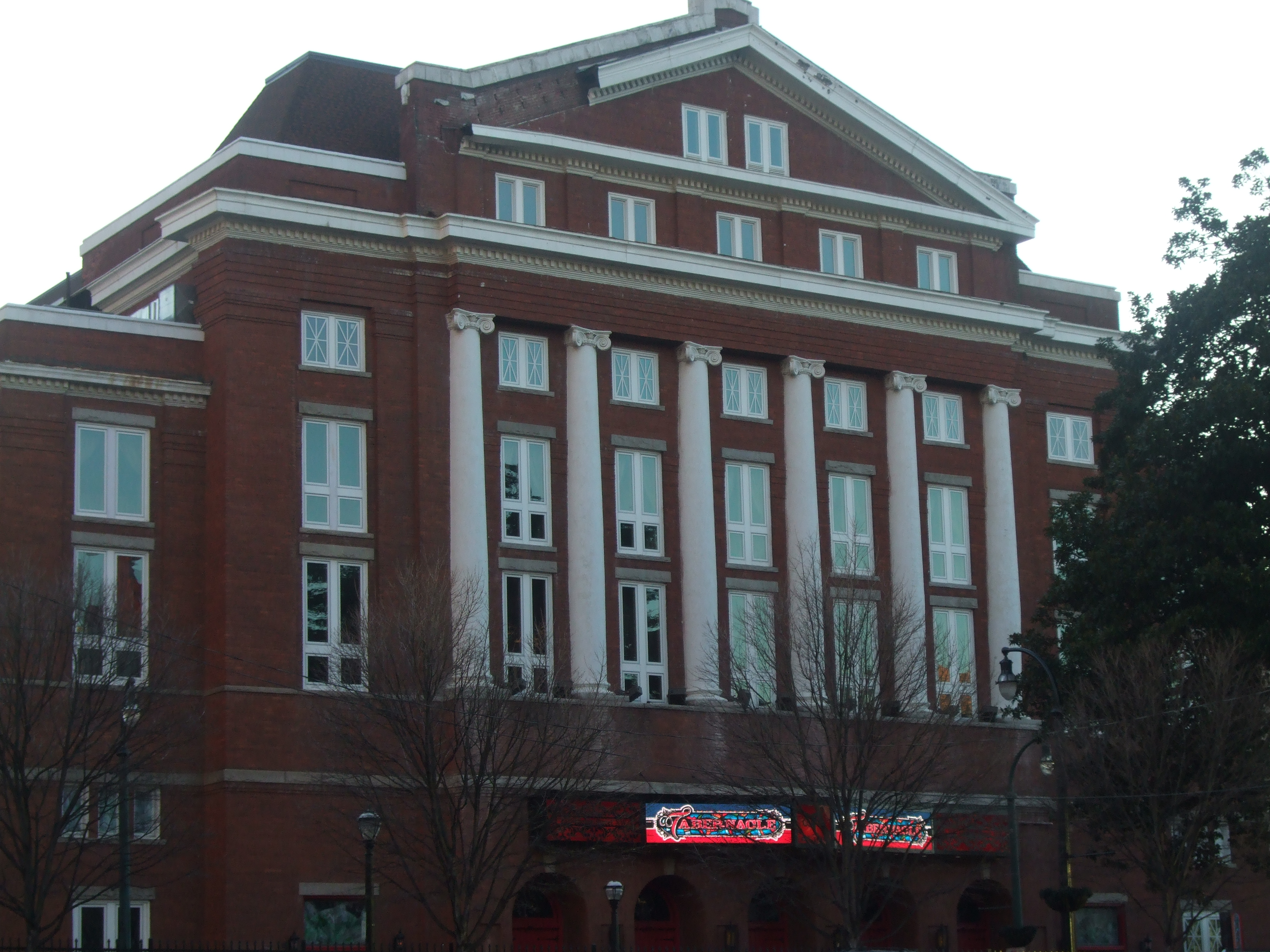
- Exterior of the venue (c. 2009)
- Interactive map of The Tabernacle
- Full name: Tabernacle Presented by iTHINK Financial
- Former names: House of Blues (1996-97)
- Address: 152 Luckie St NW; Atlanta, GA 30303-2006
- Location: Downtown Atlanta
- Owner: Live Nation
- Capacity: 2,600

Construction
- Groundbreaking: August 17, 1909
- Opened: September 3, 1911
- Renovated: 1994-96; 2008; 2014
- Cost: $125,000 ($4.32 million in 2025 dollars)
- Architect: Reuben Harrison Hunt

Website
- Venue Website

The Tabernacle is a mid-size concert hall located in Downtown Atlanta, Georgia. Opening in 1911 as a church, the building was converted into a music venue in 1996. It is owned and managed by concert promoter Live Nation Entertainment and has a capacity of 2,600 people.

Since its rebranding, many notable acts performed at the venue, including: Guns N' Roses, Tove Lo, The Black Crowes, Oasis, Adele, Eminem, Kendrick Lamar, Robbie Williams, Alice in Chains, Bob Dylan, Prince & The New Power Generation, Lana Del Rey, Babymetal, Blackberry Smoke, and Atlanta's own Mastodon.

Along with music concerts, the venue also holds many comedy tours annually including Bob Saget, Lisa Lampanelli, Cheech & Chong and Stephen Lynch. Dave Chappelle recorded his award-winning special Sticks and Stones at the venue.

== History ==
The building is over a century old and has a varied history.

=== Baptist Tabernacle (1911–1994) ===
Dr. Len G. Broughton was recruited from Virginia to become pastor of Third Baptist Church in Atlanta in March 1898. Within a year he had founded a new Baptist Tabernacle church on the southwest corner of Luckie and Harris streets (now the middle of Centennial Olympic Park). Rev. Broughton was closely associated with the church in its early years, leading the local press to refer to it as "Broughton's Tabernacle", though this was never the official name of the church or any of its buildings. The new church was quite successful and had to be expanded several times to accommodate growth.

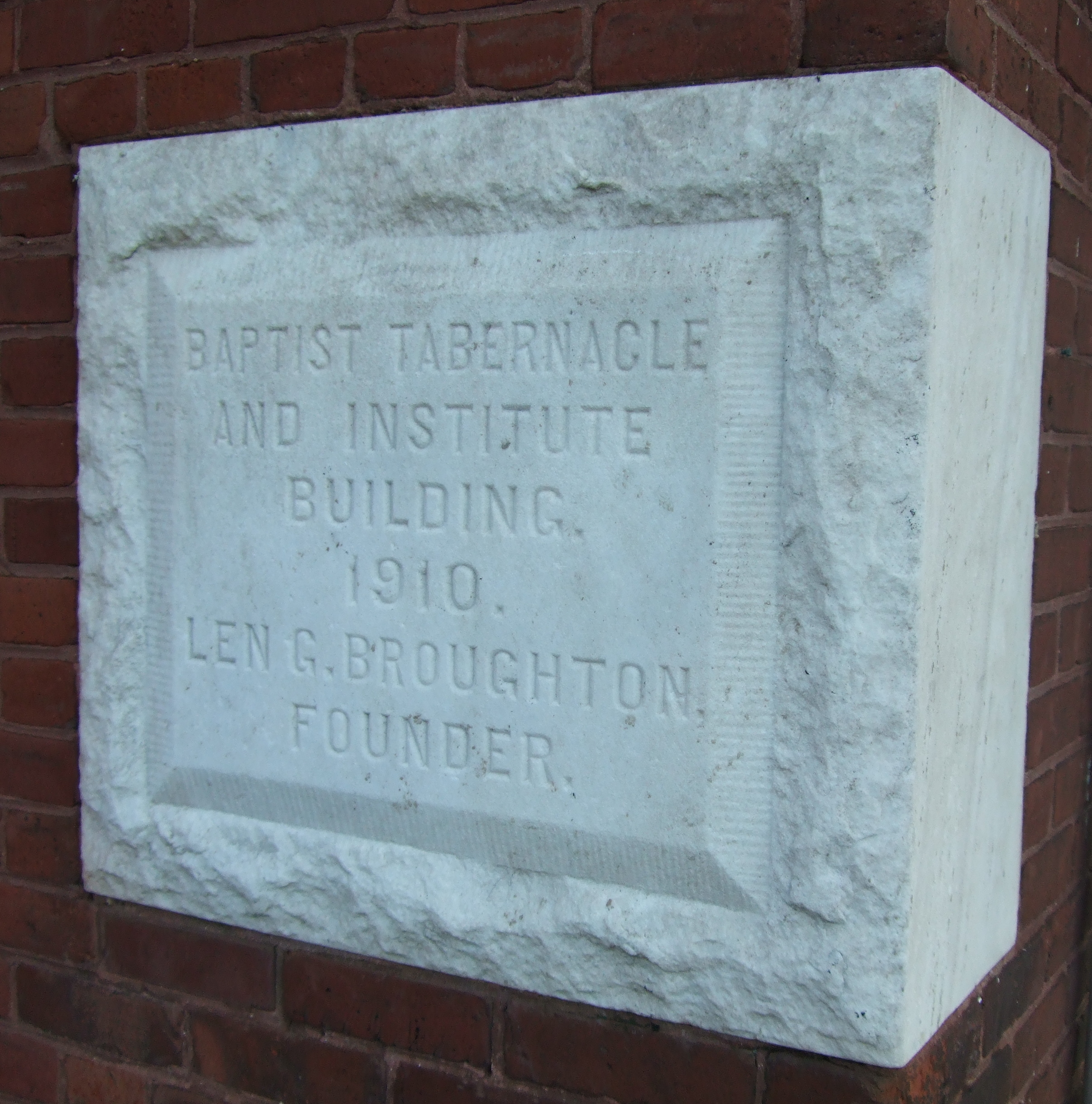
The cornerstone of the building, placed March 1910

Seeing the need for further growth, Broughton sought another location closer to the center of town, which led to the current property on Luckie St. However his Board of Deacons found the price too high and declined to buy it. As a result, Broughton himself and a few of his deacons bought the property on July 7, 1906, and gave it to the church. The Atlanta Constitution reported the $52,000 transaction on its front page, reporting it as "one of the most important real estate and church transactions ever made in Atlanta" and described an auditorium "eight or ten stories in height" and estimated construction cost at $250,000.

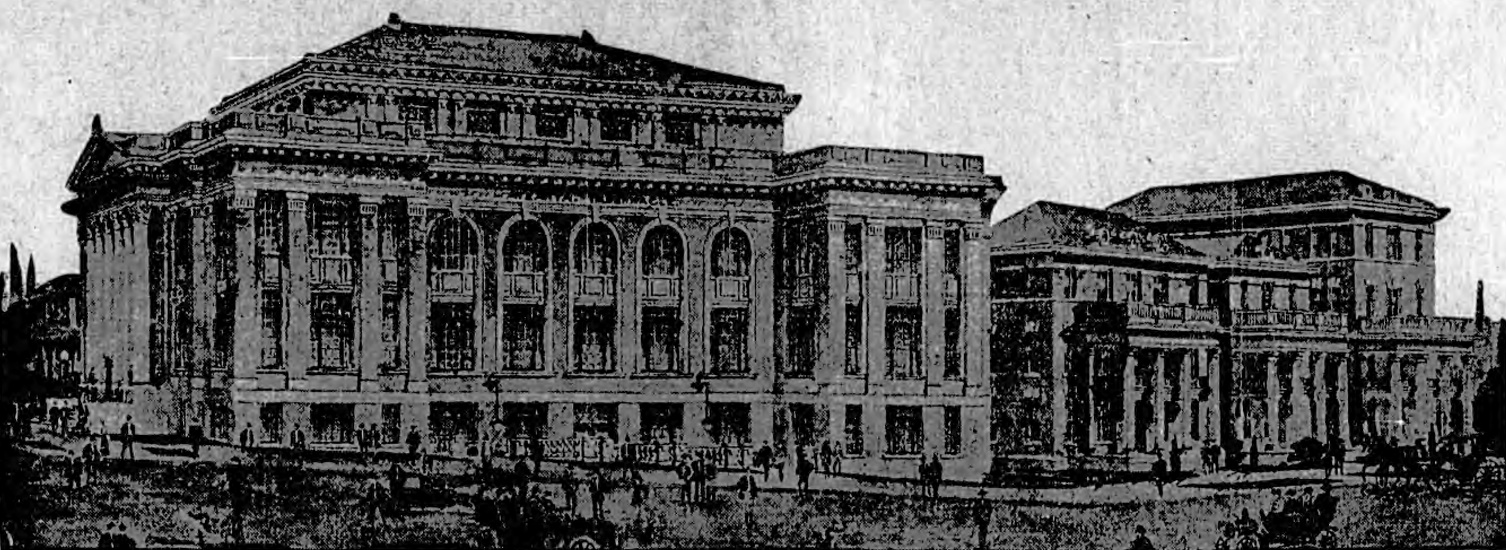
R. H. Hunt's original proposed design, 1907

The building was designed by noted Chattanooga architect Reuben Harrison Hunt, along with three other buildings for the same site including a nurses dormitory and a hospital building. (None of these other buildings survive to the present day). The plans were revealed in November 1907 and depict a church building somewhat larger than what was finally constructed, extending all the way to the corner of Luckie and Spring Street (see photo).

Ground-breaking ceremonies were held for the new building on August 17, 1909, at which time the construction cost had been revised to $125,000. At the time the membership of the church was 1,850 (up from 350 at its founding ten years before). Broughton, who was preaching at Fifth Avenue Presbyterian Church at the time, was not present at the ground-breaking.

The cornerstone for the building was laid at the end of the 1910 Bible Conference held at the church. Immediately after a sermon by F. B. Meyer on March 9, 1910, an "immense crowd" adjourned to the construction site. Meyer said at the ceremony, "I believe that this will be a historic occasion, not only in the history of the church but not unworthy to be chronicled in the history of this great and beautiful city." Paul Dwight Moody (son of D. L. Moody) also spoke at the ceremony. Broughton placed some papers in the stone including that day's program, the membership roll of the church and a list of officers. He capped the stone and sealed it with mortar.

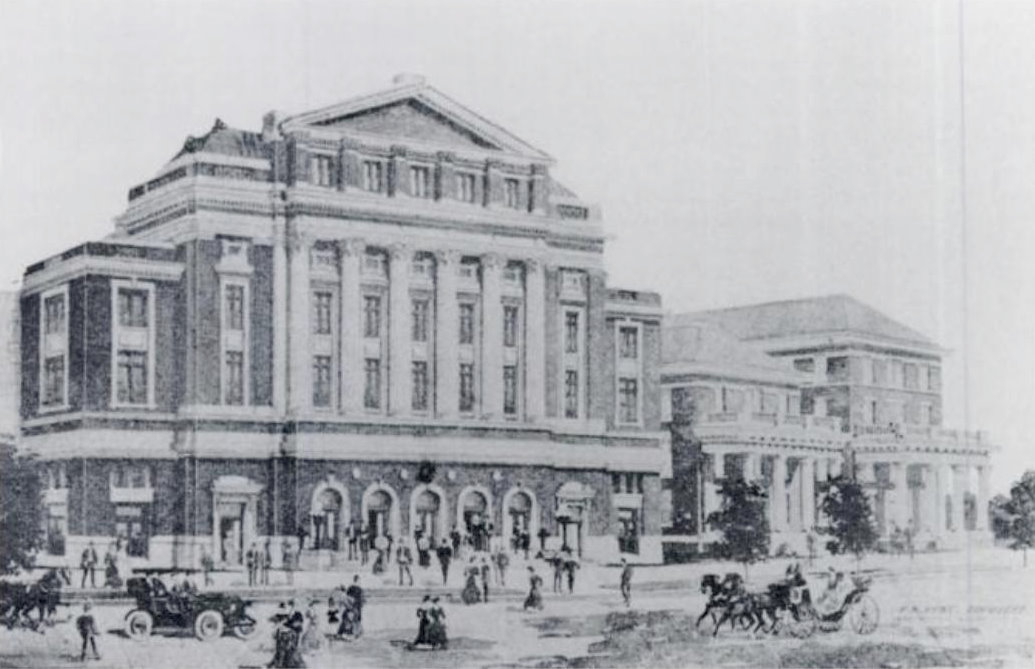
R. H. Hunt's architectural rendering of the final design, 1909

The structure measures 147 by 130 feet with an exterior of red brick trimmed by granite. The style is neoclassical with Ionic columns and arches on the facade. The auditorium would seat 4,000 people (including the galleries) and the Sunday school facilities below could seat 3,000. The rostrum could accommodate a chorus of 500 people and featured a pipe organ that cost $15,000. The original planned opening was in May 1911, but this was eventually delayed.

The first services in the new building were held on September 3, 1911, beginning with a Sunday school at 9:30 (attended by 2,000). The doors opened for the main service at 10:40 am, by which time some people had been waiting two hours to enter. A week-long dedication for the church was held from September 10 to 17, 1911, during which as many as 8,000 people crowded into the auditorium and hundreds more were turned away.

On the very first day in the new building, Broughton gave a sermon criticizing local politicians for standing in the way of prohibition. Aside from the temperance movement, Broughton was outspoken on other political issues, and over the coming years he would have guest speakers appear at the Tabernacle toward this end. These included (then Vice President elect) Calvin Coolidge, Frank Hanly and others. Guest religious speakers appeared as well, including Russell Conwell, G. Campbell Morgan Billy Sunday and George Washington Truett.

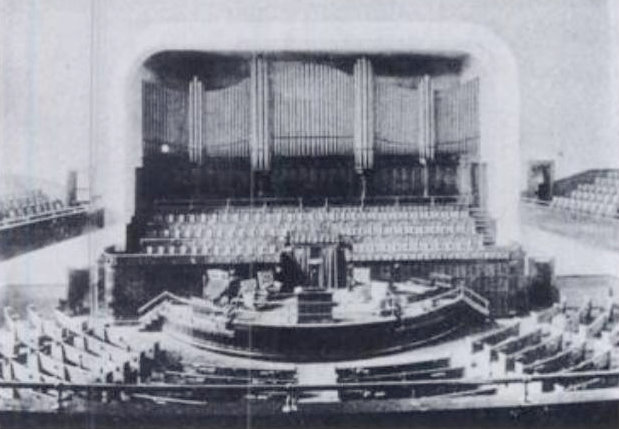
Photo of the rostrum showing the choir seats and large pipe organ, 1920

The congregation reached its peak in the 1950s with a membership of over 3,000. However, the phenomenon of white flight caused the church to go into decline in the decades afterward. By the 1980s, attendance at the church had dwindled to around 500, and it had trouble attracting a permanent pastor.

An attempt by the city government to give the building historic status was resisted in 1989, the members citing a loan plan necessary to ensure the survival of the church. The congregation's troubles continued after that, leading a later pastor to attempt a fast to encourage donations to save the church. (At this time the church was making ends meet via revenue from the two adjacent parking lots which it owned). These efforts were ultimately unsuccessful. In December 1991 the congregation, then numbering about 100, voted to cease having services there and ordered the trustees to find a buyer for the building.

The building's history as a church ended on Friday, October 14, 1994, when it was sold (along with the offices and the two parking lots) for $2.2 million to a group of investors led by James B. Cumming who intended to redevelop the area in conjunction with the 1996 Summer Olympics. Its position just across from Centennial Olympic Park made it very attractive as a potential Olympic entertainment venue.

=== House of Blues (1996–1997) ===
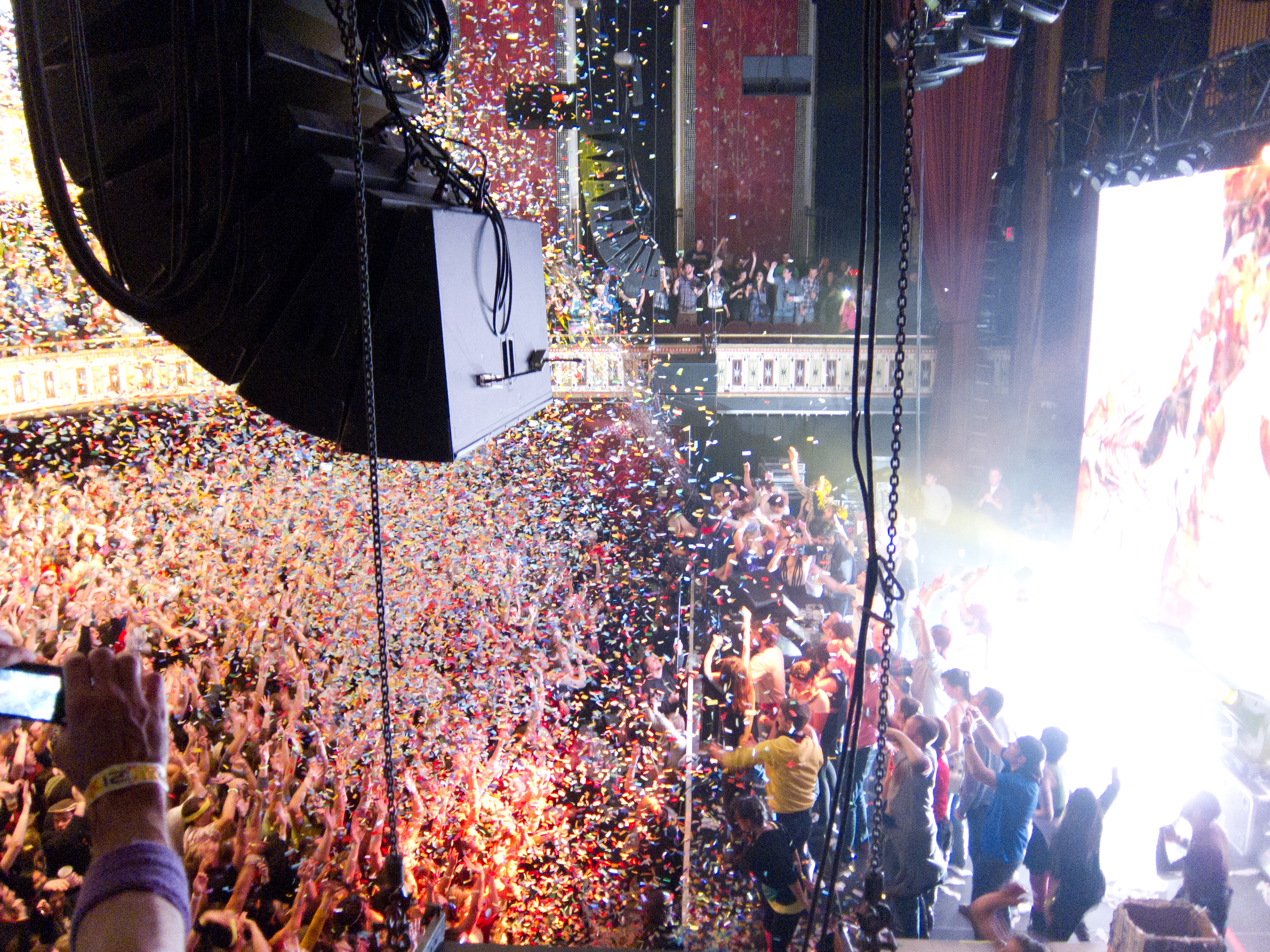
The Tabernacle during a show

At least two different teams attempted to develop the building as a venue for the Olympics with little success. As the event approached, it looked for a time that no deal would come together. Then, in April 1996, Isaac Tigrett visited Atlanta with other investors and cut a deal to open a House of Blues in the building in time for the Olympics. Prior to this, Atlanta had not been a planned expansion location for House of Blues. Tigrett gave his partner Lance Sterling the go-ahead for the project with only 45 days available, even after Sterling had told him even 60 days was too short a time. Despite this short lead time, the venue was ready when the Olympics opened in July 1996.

The first act to perform (on July 19 and 20) was The Blues Brothers (with Dan Aykroyd, James Belushi and John Goodman)' along with featured performers such as James Cotton, Luther "Guitar Junior" Johnson, Booker T. & the M.G.'s, Eddie Floyd, Tommy "Pipes" McDonald, Billy Boy Arnold and Paul Shaffer. Other well-known performers during the Olympic run included James Brown, Johnny Cash, Al Green and Jerry Lee Lewis. Lesser-known acts who appeared included Burning Spear, Johnny Clegg and Juluka, Third World, Tito Puente and His Latin Jazz All-Stars, and Celia Cruz. At the close of the Olympics, Bob Dylan performed two shows on August 3 and 4.

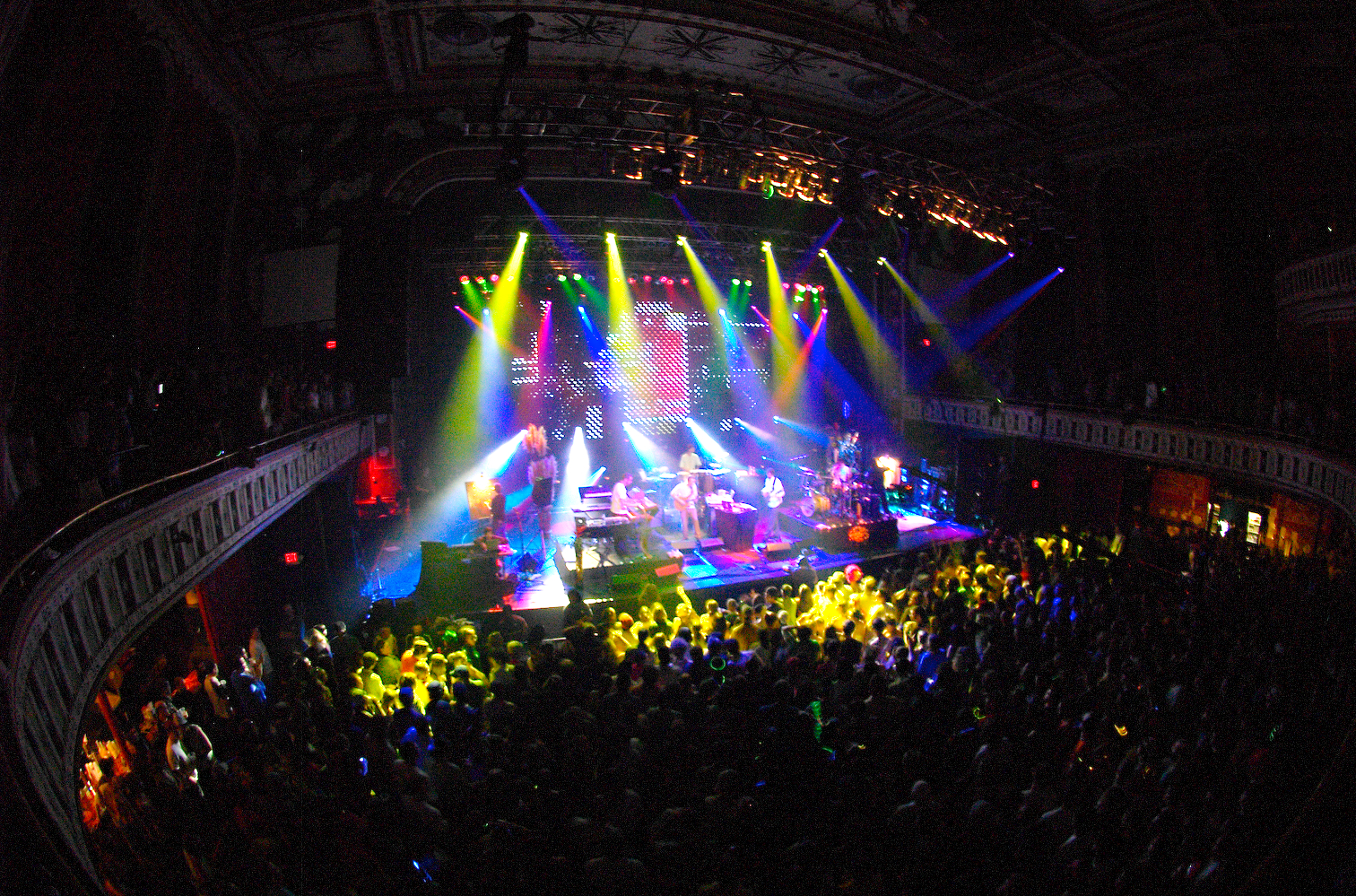
The stage

Civic leaders in Atlanta had high hopes that House of Blues would continue as a permanent downtown attraction, especially when the lease was extended through January 1997. But immediately after the Olympics were finished, word came that it would shut down. Efforts were launched to convince Tigrett to continue in Atlanta, but the local investment money he insisted upon ($4 million by some accounts) could not be found.

Some concerts were held at the venue under the House of Blues name beginning in 1997 through the efforts of Lance Sterling. The trial run began on Wednesday, November 12, 1997, with a concert by Hall & Oates. House of Blues ended its relationship with Atlanta when its lease expired for the last time in January 1998. City leaders continued negotiations with Sterling, who said "This is the premier venue in the Southeast. I am personally committed to making downtown Atlanta a venue, and I'm calling everybody I know to make this happen."

=== Tabernacle (1998–present) ===
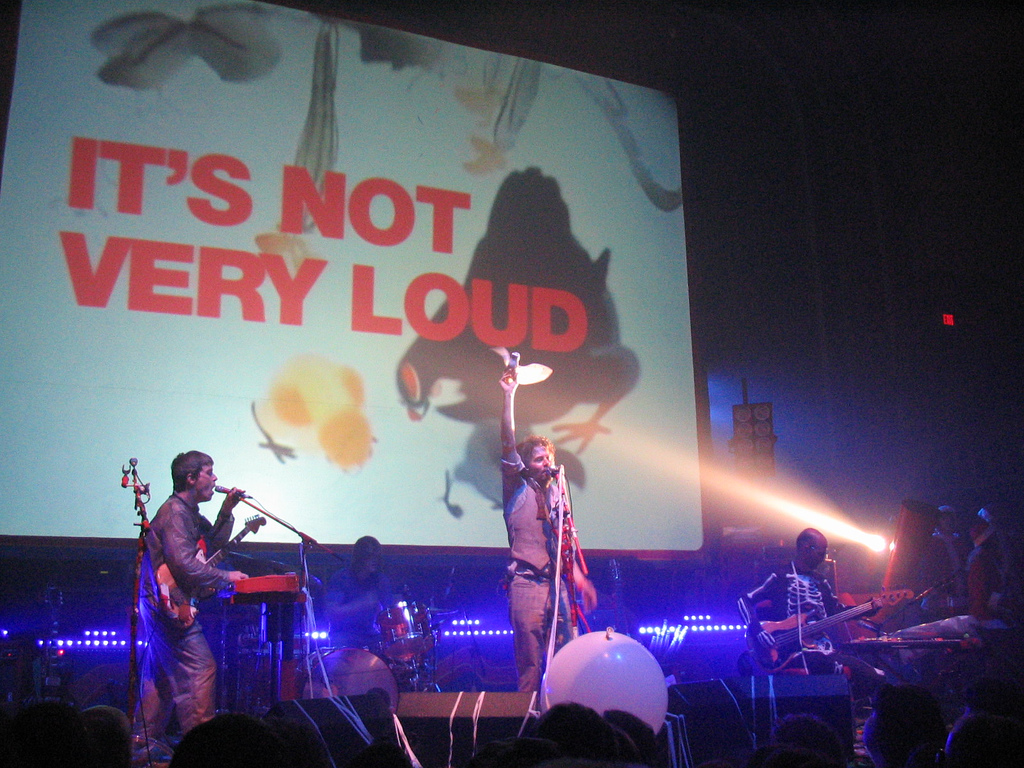
The Flaming Lips performing on September 13, 2006

On March 11, 1998, Lance Sterling announced that he had entered into a 30-year lease agreement and was investing $2 million of his own money to develop the building. The venue was renamed Tabernacle at this time, affectionately called "The Tabby". The reopening was set for March 28, the same day that Centennial Olympic Park was set to reopen across the street. The Tabernacle operated as a successful concert venue under Sterling's management for almost two years.

Eventually Sterling (whose home is in California) found the business was conflicting with his family life. "I would spend a week there and a week home. It was just too much", he said. He sold his interest in the building to SFX Entertainment (now Live Nation) on December 17, 1999.

At the same time as the SFX sale, local music promoters Alex Cooley and Peter Conlon announced that they would move their Cotton Club to the basement of the building (the former Sunday school room) as an additional feature of the venue. Cotton Club reopened Friday, February 11, 2000, with a show by Staind. Cotton Club operated in the lower level of the Tabernacle until November 20, 2004. The last performer was Helmet.

The Tabernacle continues as a major concert venue in Atlanta. Conan O'Brien hosted a week of Conan shows at the Tabernacle from April 1 to 4, 2013.

==== 2008 tornado ====
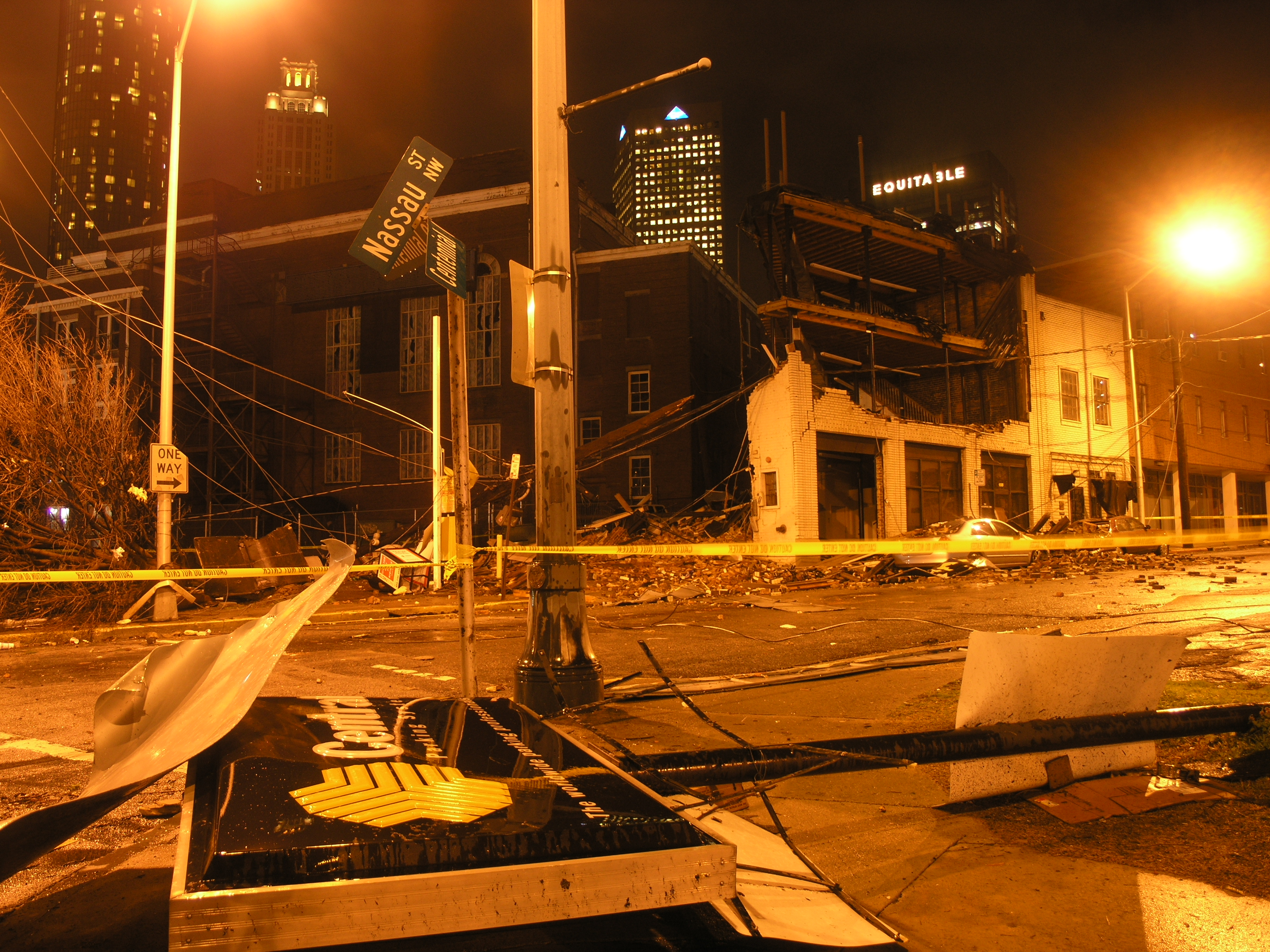
Debris including knocked-down signs are scattered on the street with the Tabernacle building in the background.

On March 14, 2008, the Tabernacle sustained extensive damage when a tornado tore through downtown Atlanta. Windows were blown out and the roof was severely damaged. A broken water pipe caused additional damage. It was the first tornado to hit the downtown area since weather record keeping began in late 1878, or unofficially at any time in the city's history.

Major repairs and restoration took less than two months, working around the clock. Because the ornate plasterwork on the ceiling could not be repaired, drywall and molding were used to re-create the same designs. The original painter from the 1996 opening was found to repaint the repaired sections. Upgrades were also done to electrical and other systems.

==== 2014 floor collapse ====
Shortly after the beginning of a Panic! at the Disco concert, the building was evacuated due to possible cracking in the floor.

== Awards ==
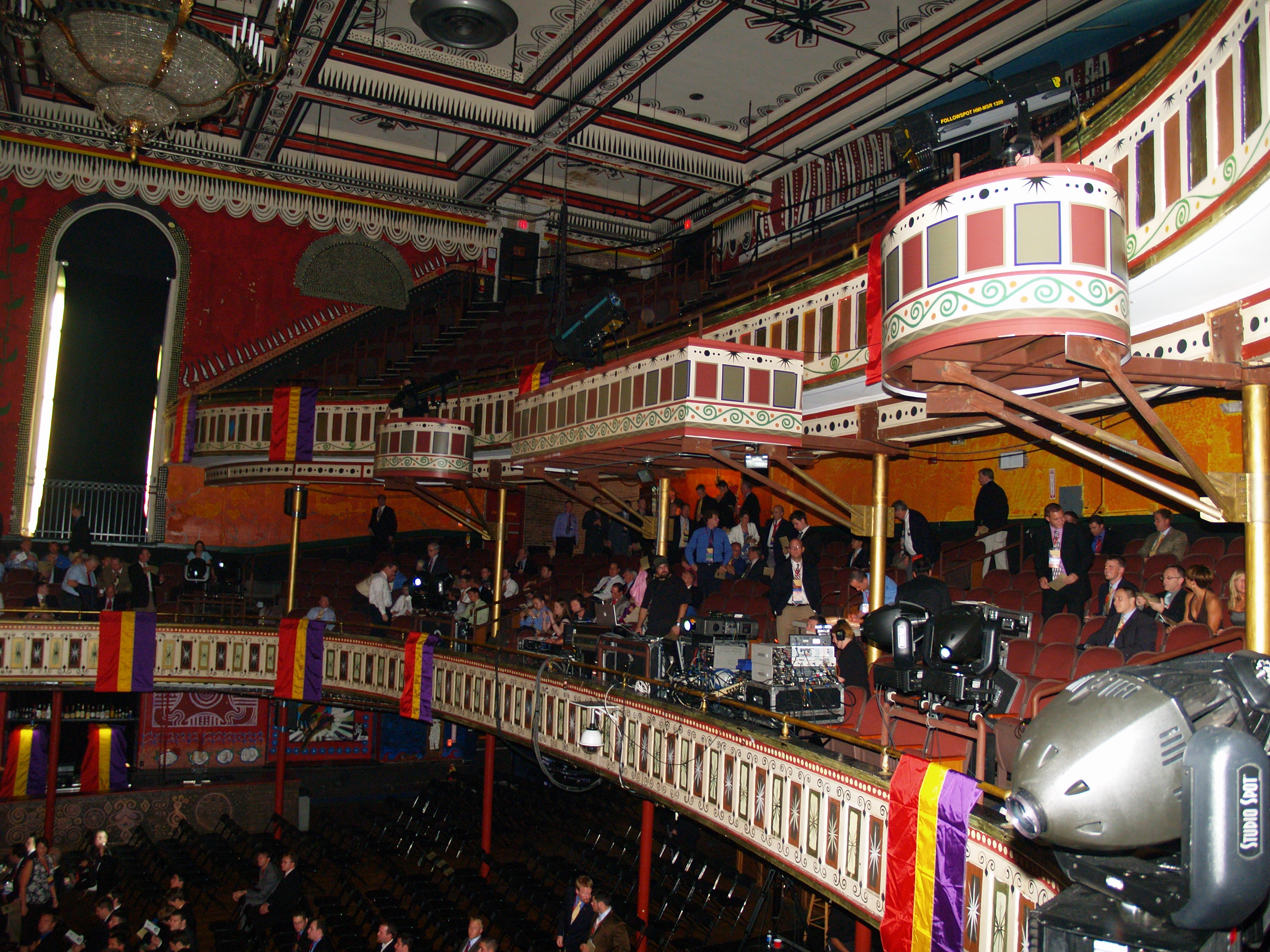
The psychedelic interior of the Tabernacle

The Tabernacle has been named one of the best concert venues in the nation by Rolling Stone, Paste magazine and USA Today.

It has also won numerous "Best of Atlanta" awards over the years:

- The Technique Best of Tech: 2003 Best Concert Venue
- Creative Loafing 2003 Best New Use for an Old Building - TIE (Readers' Pick)
- Creative Loafing 2004 Best Concert Venue (Citizens' Choice)
- Access Atlanta Best of the Big A: 2005 Best Live Music Club
- The Technique Best of Tech: 2006 Best Concert Venue
- Creative Loafing 2006 Best Concert Venue (Readers' Pick)
- The Technique Best of Tech: 2007 Best Concert Venue
- The Technique Best of Tech: 2009 Best Concert Venue (Student Pick)
- Creative Loafing 2010 Best Concert Venue (Reader Pick)

== In popular culture ==
- Pop-rockers Cartel reference the club and the culture surrounding it in their song "Luckie St."
- Singer, songwriter, and producer Butch Walker references the Tabernacle on his live CD/DVD, Leavin' the Game on Luckie Street, which was recorded at the venue in 2007.

== See also ==
- House Of Blues
