= The Rise and Fall of Butch Walker and the Let's-Go-Out-Tonites =

Studio album by Butch Walker
- Released: July 11, 2006
- Recorded: January 2006
- Studio: Ruby Red Productions (Atlanta, Georgia)
- Genres: Alternative rock, pop rock
- Length: 42:29
- Labels: Epic; One Haven Music; Red Ink
- Producer: Butch Walker

Butch Walker chronology
Cover Me Badd (2005)	The Rise and Fall of Butch Walker and the Let's-Go-Out-Tonites (2006)	Leavin' the Game on Luckie Street (2008)

Professional ratings
Review scores
Source	Rating
AllMusic	4/5 stars
PopMatters	8/10
Sputnikmusic	3.5/5

The Rise and Fall of Butch Walker and the Let's-Go-Out-Tonites is the third full-length solo album by Butch Walker, released on July 11, 2006 on Epic Records. The album's title is a reference to the David Bowie album The Rise and Fall of Ziggy Stardust and the Spiders from Mars. The album's lead single was "Bethamphetamine (Pretty, Pretty)". The video for the single featured Avril Lavigne in a starring role and was inspired in the story of Christiane F. Those who preordered the album from select outlets were given the bonus track "New York Minute" in mp3 format.

== Track listing ==
All songs were written by Butch Walker.

No.	Title	Length
1.	"Oooh... Aaah..."	0:22
2.	"Hot Girls in Good Moods"	3:45
3.	"Ladies and Gentlemen... "The Let's Go Out Tonites!""	3:44
4.	"Bethamphetamine (Pretty, Pretty)"	3:09
5.	"Too Famous to Get Fully Dressed"	3:04
6.	"We're All Going Down"	4:16
7.	"Dominoes"	3:58
8.	"Paid to Get Excited"	3:00
9.	"Song Without a Chorus" (featuring Pink)	2:37
10.	"The Taste of Red"	4:06
11.	"Rich People Die Unhappy"	2:29
12.	"This Is the Sweetest Little Song"	4:14
13.	"When Canyons Ruled the City"	4:44

Japanese bonus tracks
No.	Title	Length
14.	"New York Minute"	3:08
15.	"Live and Let Die"	3:14

== Personnel ==
- Butch Walker – vocals, additional guitars, additional bass, piano, organ, percussion
- Michael Guy Chislett – guitar, keyboards, claps, backing vocals
- Darren Dodd – drums, percussion, backing vocals, claps
- Randy Michael – acoustic guitars
- Wes Flowers – Hammond organ, keys
- James Hall – backing vocals, piano, trumpet, harmonica
- Dr. Brad Goron – horn section
- Page Waldrop – pedal steel
- Yvette Petit – backing vocals
- Alecia "Pink" Moore – guest vocals on "Song Without a Chorus"
