= Afraid of Ghosts =

Studio album by Butch Walker
- Released: February 3, 2015
- Recorded: PAX AM Studios, Los Angeles
- Genres: Alternative rock, pop rock, folk rock
- Length: 39:01
- Labels: Dangerbird Records (US), Lojinx (Europe)
- Producer: Ryan Adams

Butch Walker chronology
| The Spade (2011) | Afraid of Ghosts (2015) | Stay Gold (2016) |

Afraid of Ghosts is the seventh full-length studio album from Butch Walker, and was released on Lojinx records in Europe on 2 February 2015 and Dangerbird Records in North America on February 3, 2015. It is his first album in three years since The Spade in 2011. The album was announced on October 6, 2014, with the release of its first single, "Chrissie Hynde". The album's title track premiered on October 20, 2014.

Walker spent a year writing this album, and recorded it in only four days, a year after the passing of his father. According to Walker, the album is a way of "coming to terms with the past and living for the future." It's about "coming to terms with your ghosts, taking what scares you the most. And turning it into something real." The album was produced by singer/songwriter Ryan Adams at his PAX AM Studios, and features guest musicians such as Johnny Depp, Mike Viola, and Bob Mould.

== Reception ==
Professional ratings
Aggregate scores
| Source | Rating |
|---|---|
| Metacritic | 77/100 |
Review scores
| Source | Rating |
| AbsolutePunk | 10/10 stars |
| Allmusic | 3/5 stars |
| American Songwriter | 4/5 stars |
| The A.V. Club | B |
| Music Connection | 7/10 stars |
| Sputnikmusic | 4.2/5 stars |

Afraid of Ghosts received mostly positive reviews. Its Metacritic rating of 77 out of 100 indicates "generally favorable reviews".

The album debuted on Billboard 200 at No. 104, selling around 6,000 copies in the first week. It has sold 13,000 copies in the United States as of July 2016.

== Track listing ==
| No. | Title | Writer(s) | Length |
|---|---|---|---|
| 1. | "Afraid of Ghosts" | Butch Walker | 4:57 |
| 2. | "I Love You" | Walker | 3:01 |
| 3. | "Chrissie Hynde" | Walker | 4:09 |
| 4. | "Still Drunk" | Walker | 4:05 |
| 5. | "How Are Things, Love?" | Walker | 4:15 |
| 6. | "Bed On Fire" | Walker | 3:58 |
| 7. | "21+" | Walker | 3:45 |
| 8. | "Autumn Leaves" | Walker | 3:31 |
| 9. | "Father's Day" | Walker, Ryan Adams | 4:45 |
| 10. | "The Dark" | Walker, Adams | 2:35 |

== Musicians ==
- Butch Walker – vocals, acoustic guitar, electric guitar
- Mike Viola – 12-string acoustic guitar, piano, electric guitar, baritone guitar, bass, vocals
- Daniel Clarke – piano, pump organ, keys, vocals
- Stephen Patt – accordion, acoustic guitar, pedal steel, dobro, vocals
- Charlie Stavish – bass
- Freddy Bakkenheuser – drums
- The Section Quartet – strings
- Ryan Adams – drums (track 6)
- Johnny Depp – guitar solo (track 7)
- Bob Mould – 12-string acoustic guitar, electric guitar, vocals (track 9)

== Charts ==
| Chart (2015) | Peak position |
|---|---|
| US Billboard 200 | 104 |
| US Independent Albums (Billboard) | 6 |
| US Americana/Folk Albums (Billboard) | 4 |
| US Top Rock Albums (Billboard) | 12 |
| US Indie Store Album Sales (Billboard) | 21 |
| US Vinyl Albums (Billboard) | 13 |
