= ReadySexGo =

Studio album by Marvelous 3
- Released: September 12, 2000
- Recorded: Fall 1999–Spring 2000
- Genre: Pop-punk; power pop; alternative rock
- Length: 48:09
- Label: Elektra
- Producer: Jerry Finn; Butch Walker

Marvelous 3 chronology
Hey! Album (1998)	ReadySexGo (2000)	IV (2023)

ReadySexGo is the third album from American rock band Marvelous 3. It was released on September 12, 2000. The album produced the commercial single, "Sugarbuzz", along with a promotional radio single, "Get Over", that received moderate regional airplay. The album was the band's last, as they battled record label executives at Elektra.

The album peaked at #196 on the Billboard 200 charts two weeks after its release.

The recording sessions also yielded studio cover versions of "Always Something There to Remind Me" by Naked Eyes (a live staple of the band), "People Are Strange" by The Doors and Steely Dan's "Reelin' In The Years", which was used on the soundtrack of the Jim Carrey film Me, Myself & Irene. The band also appeared in the "Sight Unseen" episode of the television show Charmed, performing "Cold as Hell".

== Reception ==
The album received three out of five stars from MacKenzie Wilson of Allmusic. She said "The guitar hooks are catchy and energetic, but the album half-heartedly swings along the typical love betrayal and rejection found on Marvelous 3's first two albums". In 2009 music critic Phil Jupp named the album third on his list of top ten favorite albums of the 2000s (decade).

== Track listing ==
All songs written by Butch Walker; "Cigarette Lighter Love Song" contains an interpolation of "All the Young Dudes" (written by David Bowie).

1. "Little Head" – 3:19
2. "Grant Park" – 3:42
3. "Get Over" – 3:57
4. "Sugarbuzz" – 3:40
5. "Supernatural Blonde" – 3:11
6. "Radio Tokyo" – 5:14
7. "Cold as Hell" – 3:10
8. "Beautiful" – 4:04
9. "I'm Losing You" – 3:18
10. "This Time" – 3:13
11. "Better Off Alone" – 2:46
12. "I Could Change" – 3:29
13. "Cigarette Lighter Love Song" – 4:47
14. "Closing Credits" – 7:28 (includes "I'm Losing You Remix" as hidden track)

== Guest musicians ==
- Kevin Lawson - backing vocals
- Yogi (courtesy of Buckcherry) - guitar (guitar solo in "Radio Tokyo")
- Jeremy Popoff courtesy of Lit - guitar (harmony guitar solo in "Get Over")
- Roger Joseph Manning Jr. - piano ("Radio Tokyo" and "Cigarette Lighter Love Song")
