= Butch Walker as... Glenn =

Studio album by Butch Walker
- Released: January 20, 2023
- Recorded: 2022
- Studio: The Butcher Shop; (Nashville, Tennessee)
- Genres: Pop rock; soft rock
- Length: 39:57
- Label: Ruby Red Records
- Producer: Butch Walker

Butch Walker chronology
American Love Story (2020)	Butch Walker as... Glenn (2023)

Singles from Butch Walker as... Glenn
- 1. "Holy Water Hangover" Released: July 25, 2022; 2. "Leather Weather (Mr. and Ms. Understanding)" Released: August 10, 2022

Butch Walker as... Glenn is the tenth and final studio album by Butch Walker. It was released on Ruby Red Records on August 26, 2022.

== Reception ==
Professional ratings
Review scores
Source	Rating
AllMusic	4/5 stars

In a positive review, Stephen Thomas Erlewine of AllMusic stated "Butch Walker doesn't disguise that his 2022 album finds him playing a role. Specifically, he's playing a piano man called Glenn, a storyteller fated to sing his heart out at dive bars where the audience is half-listening as they're preoccupied by their own problems."

== Track listing ==
All tracks are written by Butch Walker and Morgan Kibby.

No.	Title	Length
1.	"The Band Takes the Stage"	0:24
2.	"Leather Weather (Mr. and Ms. Understanding)"	3:31
3.	"Roll Away (Like a Stone)"	4:46
4.	"Avalanche"	3:35
5.	"State-Line Fireworks (with Sue Clayton)"	3:54
6.	"Slow Leak"	4:14
7.	"Bar Fight"	0:46
8.	"Tell Me I'm Pretty (Bethamphetamine Pt 2)"	3:20
9.	"Holy Water Hangover"	3:22
10.	"Don't Let It Weigh Heavy on Your Heart (with Elizabeth Cook)"	3:59
11.	"The Negotiator"	2:54
12.	"The Band Plays an Encore"	1:20
13.	"Lean Into Me"	3:51

== Personnel ==
Adapted from AllMusic.

- Aaron Embry – organ, piano, synthesizer
- Mark Stepro – drums, percussion
- WhyNot Jansveld – bass
- Butch Walker – acoustic guitar, electric guitar, lead vocals, backing vocals, percussion, piano

=== Additional musicians ===
- Morgan Kibby – vocals on "State-Line Fireworks"
- Aaron Lee Tasjan – electric guitar
- Ariel Posen – slide guitar
- Christopher Wray – pedal steel
- Elizabeth Cook – vocals on "Don't Let It Weigh Heavy On Your Heart"
- Sadler Vaden – electric guitar
- Wade Sapp – background vocals
- The Watson Twins – background vocals
