= Leavin' the Game on Luckie Street =

Live album by Butch Walker
- Released: February 14, 2008 (CD); March 17, 2008 (DVD)
- Recorded: April 20, 2007
- Venues: The Tabernacle, Atlanta, GA
- Genres: Alternative rock, pop rock
- Producer: Butch Walker

Butch Walker chronology
The Rise and Fall of Butch Walker and the Let's-Go-Out-Tonites! (2006)	Leavin' the Game on Luckie Street (2008)	Live at Lollapalooza 2008 (2008)

Leavin' the Game on Luckie Street is a live album recording by American singer-songwriter Butch Walker and his band the Let's-Go-Out-Tonites!. The concert was recorded live April 20, 2007, at the Tabernacle in Atlanta, Georgia. Initially released only online, the album was eventually released on CD February 14, 2008, simultaneously offered as a free download at his website and select online partners (including the short-lived social media networking website FriendsOrEnemies.com), and soon after on DVD March 17, 2008.

== CD track list ==
Disc 1

No.	Title	Length
1.	"Intro"	0:48
2.	"Uncomfortably Numb"	3:49
3.	"Alicia Amnesia"	5:48
4.	"#1 Summer Jam"	3:20
5.	"Too Famous to Get Fully Dressed"	3:18
6.	"Maybe It's Just Me"	3:32
7.	"Bethamphetamine"	4:39
8.	"Ladies and Gentlemen, the Let's Go Out Tonites"	3:52
9.	"Don't Move"	4:13
10.	"Indie Queen" (Marvelous 3)	5:12
11.	"Laid (James cover) / The Taste of Red"	5:26
12.	"Far Away from Close"	3:41

Disc 2

No.	Title	Length
1.	"Over Your Head" (Marvelous 3)	4:26
2.	"Race Cars and Goth Rock"	7:25
3.	"Mixtape"	5:17
4.	"Stateline"	4:13
5.	"Sober"	3:42
6.	"Joan"	4:40
7.	"Cigarette Lighter Love Song" (Marvelous 3)	5:59
8.	"Best Thing You Never Had"	9:16
9.	"Hot Girls in Good Moods"	4:01
10.	"Lights Out"	13:17
11.	"When Canyons Ruled the City"	7:52

== DVD content ==
Leavin' the Game on Luckie St
- Directed by: Tim Daust
- Distributed by: The Record Business Is Fucked
- Release date: March 17, 2008
- Running time: 126 minutes
- Country: United States

=== Setlist ===
1. Intro
2. Uncomfortably Numb
3. Alicia Amnesia
4. #1 Summer Jam
5. Too Famous to Get Dressed
6. Maybe It's Just Me
7. Bethamphetamine
8. Ladies and Gentlemen, the Let's-Go-Out-Tonites!
9. Don't Move
10. Indie Queen
11. Laid/Taste of Red
12. Far Away From Close
13. Over Your Head
14. Race Cars & Goth Rock
15. Mixtape
16. Stateline
17. Sober
18. Joan
19. Cigarette Lighter Love Song
20. Best Thing You Never Had
21. Hot Girls in Good Moods
22. Born to Run (Bruce Springsteen)
23. Lights Out
24. Canyons

== Credits ==
=== Personnel ===
Butch Walker & the Let's-Go-Out-Tonites!:

- Butch Walker – lead vocals, guitar, piano
- Darren Dodd – drums, backing vocals
- Wes Flowers – keyboards, backing vocals
- Randy Michael – bass
- Jamie Arentzen – guitar

=== Crew ===
- Mitch Lerner – front of house, tour manager
- Brock Hogan – lighting design
- Billy Hempel – stage manager
- Andy Hosoi – merchandise

=== Filmed ===
- Tabernacle, Atlanta, Georgia. April 20, 2007

=== Executive producer ===
- Chris Unck, El! Smacko! Productions

=== Producers ===
- Chris Unck, El! Smacko! Productions
- Carl Diebold, Sincera Entertainment
- Ryan Lassan, Autumn Addict

=== Directors ===
- Tim Daust, Reelmind Studios
