= Hey! Album =

Studio album by Marvelous 3
- Released: 1998
- Recorded: 1997–1998
- Genres: Pop punk; alternative rock
- Length: 46:51
- Labels: Marvelous; Elektra
- Producers: Jim Ebert; Butch Walker

Marvelous 3 chronology
Math and Other Problems (1997)	Hey! Album (1998)	ReadySexGo (2000)

Alternative cover
- Original indie release cover

Professional ratings
Review scores
Source	Rating
AllMusic	4/5 stars
Los Angeles Times	3/4 stars
Rolling Stone	3/5 stars

Hey! Album is the second album by the American rock band Marvelous 3, released independently on the band's own Marvelous Records in 1998. The album's original independent release featured three tracks, "Cold As Hell", "Fastboat", and "I Just Wanna Go Home" that would be dropped in the favor of "Write It On Your Hand" and "Vampires In Love" when the album was re-released on the major label Elektra.

In mid-1998 the band was signed by Elektra Records and a repackaged, remixed (and overdubbed) and reshuffled version of the album was released on October 27, 1998. With national buzz seeping from the airwaves of WNNX-FM in Atlanta, the album's lead single "Freak Of The Week" carried the band into 1999, reaching #5 on Billboard's Modern Rock Tracks chart and #23 on the Mainstream Rock Tracks chart. The band spent most of 1998 and 1999 on the road in support of the album, opening for bands such as Collective Soul and co-headlining a club tour with Dynamite Hack.

== Critical reception ==
The Los Angeles Times wrote that the band "concocts an often fetching blend of glam-tinged power-pop and Elvis Costello-style gibes."

AllMusic called Hey! Album "a likeable, melodic album, full of self-conscious and self-deprecating lyrics bordering on preciousness."

== Track listing ==
All songs written by Butch Walker.

=== Official studio release ===
1. "You're So Yesterday" - 3:56
2. "Freak of the Week" - 3:20
3. "Until You See" - 4:20
4. "Write it on Your Hand" - 3:23
5. "Let Me Go" - 3:21
6. "Every Monday" - 3:06
7. "Indie Queen" - 4:52
8. "#27" - 2:51
9. "Mrs. Jackson" - 3:33
10. "Over Your Head" - 3:40
11. "Vampires in Love" - 4:01
12. "Lemonade" - 6:42

=== Original independent release ===
1. "You're So Yesterday"
2. "Freak of the Week"
3. "Until You See"
4. "Let Me Go"
5. "Every Monday"
6. "Indie Queen"
7. "Lemonade"
8. "#27"
9. "I Just Wanna Go Home"
10. "Over Your Head"
11. "Mrs. Jackson"
12. "Fastboat"
13. "Cold As Hell"
