= Math and Other Problems =

Studio album by Marvelous 3
- Released: August 12, 1997
- Recorded: 1997
- Genre: Pop punk
- Length: 37:38
- Label: Deep South

Marvelous 3 chronology
Math and Other Problems (1997)	Hey! Album (1998)

Professional ratings
Review scores
Source	Rating
AllMusic	4/5 stars

Math and Other Problems is the debut album by American rock band Marvelous 3. It was released by the Deep South label in 1997.

== Track listing ==
All songs written by Butch Walker.

1. "Appetite" - 2:57
2. "Make Up" - 3:00
3. "Last Sleep" - 3:07
4. "Leopard Print" - 3:08
5. "Retail Girl" - 3:27
6. "Pizza and Wine" - 3:35
7. "Cars Collide" - 3:59
8. "Valium" - 3:54
9. "Bottle Rockets" - 2:26
10. "I Wanna Go to the Sun" - 3:09
11. "In the Beginning of Relationships" - 1:40
12. "Katrina" - 3:16
