= The Spade =

Studio album by Butch Walker
- Released: August 30, 2011
- Genres: Alternative rock, pop rock
- Length: 34:14
- Labels: Dangerbird Records (US), Lojinx (Europe)
- Producer: Butch Walker

Butch Walker chronology
| I Liked It Better When You Had No Heart (2010) | The Spade (2011) | Afraid of Ghosts (2015) |

Professional ratings
Aggregate scores
| Source | Rating |
|---|---|
| Metacritic | 78/100 |
Review scores
| Source | Rating |
| Allmusic | 4/5 stars |
| Alternative Press | 4/5 stars |
| Slant Magazine | 3.5/5 stars |
| PopMatters | 9/10 stars |
| They Will Rock You | 5/5 stars |

The Spade is the sixth full-length studio album by Butch Walker, and the second released under the name Butch Walker and the Black Widows. It was released on August 30, 2011 on CD, vinyl, and digital formats. The lead single was "Summer of '89".

The album's single, "Synthesizers," was released on January 20, 2012. The music video for the song featuring Matthew McConaughey reprising his popular Dazed and Confused role of David Wooderson.

== Reception ==
=== Critical ===
The album received a score of 78 on the Metacritic aggregate review site, indicating a generally favorable reception. Andrew Leahey of Allmusic noted that the album "explores the seedy side of Hollywood with equal parts power pop and heartland rock & roll", and that the lyrics of the songs in the album "focus on Walker’s own little world -- the girls he’s known, the drugs he’s done, the trouble he got into as an ‘80s wild child -- but Spade feels broader, fuller, more collective than those words suggest."

Evan Sawdey of Pop Matters was very positive about the album; even though he thought the album "doesn’t do anything new or particularly innovative", he found that "it's just a damn good rock album through and through" and that Walker had "finally wrote an album that is entirely in his own voice." Andy Gill of The Independent wrote that the album is "mainly brusque and strident raunch-rock, with an unappealing cajoling tone that virtually dares you not to find the songs clever and the hooks contagious. Which they aren't, particularly."

=== Commercial ===
The album hit number one on the Billboard Heatseekers Chart in its first week of release and peaked at number 105 on the Billboard 200, selling 5,000 copies in its debut week. The album has sold 18,000 copies in the U.S. as of February 2015.

== Track listing ==
| No. | Title | Writer(s) | Length |
|---|---|---|---|
| 1. | "Bodegas and Blood" | Butch Walker, Fran Capitanelli, Michael Trent | 3:53 |
| 2. | "Every Single Body Else" | Chris Unck, Trent | 3:00 |
| 3. | "Summer of '89" | Walker | 4:15 |
| 4. | "Sweethearts" | Capitanelli, Trent | 3:03 |
| 5. | "Day Drunk" | Walker, Trent | 3:55 |
| 6. | "Synthesizers" | Jake Sinclair, Trent | 3:25 |
| 7. | "Dublin Crow" | Walker | 2:50 |
| 8. | "Closest Thing To You I'm Gonna Find" | Walker | 3:56 |
| 9. | "Bullet Belt" | Walker, Trent | 4:04 |
| 10. | "Sucker Punch" | Walker, Trent | 3:54 |

Bonus track
| No. | Title | Writer(s) | Length |
|---|---|---|---|
| 11. | "Answering Machine Girl" (iTunes U.K. bonus track) | Walker, Trent | 3:34 |

== Personnel ==
- Butch Walker - lead vocals, acoustic and electric guitars, piano, banjolin, mandolin, percussion
- Fran Capitanelli - guitars, banjo, drums, backing vocals
- Chris Unck - guitars, pedal steel, backing vocals
- Jake Sinclair - bass guitar, piano, banjolin, backing vocals
- Patrick Keeler - drums
- Michael Trent - backing vocals
- Cary Ann Hearst - backing vocals
- Gavin Fitzjohn - baritone and tenor sax, trumpet
- Dr. Steven Patt - accordion, dobro guitar
- Adam Blake - album artwork and design
