= Sycamore Meadows =

2008 studio album by Butch Walker

Studio album by Butch Walker
- Released: November 11, 2008
- Recorded: 2008
- Genres: Alternative rock, folk rock, pop rock
- Length: 60:00
- Label: Original Signal Recordings
- Producer: Butch Walker

Butch Walker chronology
Leavin' the Game on Luckie Street (2008)	Sycamore Meadows (2008)	Here Comes The... (2009)

Professional ratings
Aggregate scores
Source	Rating
Metacritic	81/100
Review scores
Source	Rating
AllMusic	4/5 stars
Alternative Press	4/5 stars
Entertainment Weekly	B+
Filter	66%
Mojo	4/5 stars
NME	7/10
Paste	5.8/10
PopMatters	8/10

Sycamore Meadows is the fourth full-length studio album by Butch Walker. It was released in the United States on November 11, 2008, through Original Signal Recordings. Walker wrote three tracks ("Ships in a Bottle", "Vessels", and "The 3 Kids In Brooklyn") prior to the Malibu house fires that took his home in November 2007. These tracks were made available on Walker's Myspace site in demo form in late 2007. Butch stated in an interview with InklingsTV that "[the fires] made [him] feel like [he] had something to prove, something that [he] needed to say". The physical packaging of the album is, according to Walker, very 'bare-bones', because he wanted it to be 'all about what's on the disc'. The album was acclaimed by music critics. At Metacritic, which assigns a normalized rating out of 100, Sycamore Meadows holds a rating of 81/100, indicating universal acclaim.

Butch released an online-only video for the first single "Ships in a Bottle" through his Myspace website on September 15, 2008. The music video for the second single "The Weight of Her" premiered on Amazon.com on November 24, 2008.

A special 180-gram vinyl-edition release of Sycamore Meadows was made available for the 2008 holiday season.

== Track listing ==
No.	Title	Length
1.	"The Weight of Her"	3:43
2.	"Going Back/Going Home"	4:02
3.	"Here Comes The..." (feat. Pink)	4:10
4.	"Ponce De Leon Ave."	4:26
5.	"Ships in a Bottle"	4:07
6.	"Vessels"	4:13
7.	"Passed Your Place, Saw Your Car, Thought of You"	5:40
8.	"The 3 Kids In Brooklyn"	4:33
9.	"Summer Scarves"	4:25
10.	"A Song for the Metalheads"	2:57
11.	"Closer to the Truth and Further from the Sky"	4:37
12.	"ATL"	5:28
13.	"Vocal and Piano"	7:44

UK/iTunes bonus track
No.	Title	Length
14.	"That Side of You"	4:34
