= Cover Me Badd =

EP by Butch Walker
- Released: October 11, 2005
- Recorded: Avril Lavigne tour 2005, acoustic solo tour 2004, Los Angeles, California, Downtown Rocks (Atlanta, Georgia)
- Genres: Alternative rock, pop rock
- Length: 26:15
- Label: Epic
- Producer: Butch Walker

Butch Walker chronology
This Is Me... Justified and Stripped (2004)	Cover Me Badd (2005)	The Rise and Fall of Butch Walker and the Let's-Go-Out-Tonites (2006)

Cover Me Badd is an EP by Butch Walker, available as a digital download from the iTunes Music Store since October 11, 2005 and on CD since December 13, 2005. It contains six cover versions of songs originally performed by Kelly Clarkson, George Jones, Elvis Costello, Wings, Queen and Sandie Shaw (in sequential order). Most of the EP was recorded live, while tracks four and six were recorded in a recording studio.

== Track listing ==
No.	Title	Writer(s)	Original artist (date)	Length
1.	"Since U Been Gone"	Lukasz Gottwald, Max Martin	Kelly Clarkson (2004)	2:15
2.	"Good Year for the Roses"	Jerry Chesnut	George Jones (1970)	4:04
3.	"Alison"	Elvis Costello	Elvis Costello (1977)	3:47
4.	"Live and Let Die"	Paul McCartney, Linda McCartney	Wings (1973)	3:14
5.	"Queen Medley"	David Bowie, John Deacon, Brian May, Freddie Mercury, Roger Taylor	Queen	8:37
6.	"Always Something There to Remind Me"	Burt Bacharach, Hal David	Sandie Shaw (1964)	4:13
