= Burn It Black =

Studio album by Injected
- Released: February 26, 2002
- Genres: Hard rock; alternative metal; post-grunge; nu metal
- Length: 48:38
- Label: Island
- Producer: Butch Walker

Singles from Burn It Black
- 1. "Faithless" Released: 2002; 2. "Bullet" Released: 2002

Professional ratings
Review scores
Source	Rating
AllMusic	4/5 stars

Burn It Black is the first studio album of the American rock band Injected. It was produced by Butch Walker and released on February 26, 2002 on Island Records.

== Track listing ==
1. "When She Comes" – 2:33 (Daniel Blaine Grady)
2. "Burn It Black" – 2:42 (Grady, Steve Slovisky)
3. "Bullet" – 3:41 (Grady)
4. "Faithless" – 3:20 (Grady)
5. "Only Hurts Awhile" – 5:11 (Grady)
6. "I-IV-V" – 3:02 (Grady)
7. "Sherman" – 3:37 (Grady, Jade Lemons)
8. "Used Up" – 3:44 (Grady, Lemons)
9. "Ms. Fortune" – 4:24 (Grady)
10. "Bloodstained" – 4:29 (Grady)
11. "Lights Are Low" – 2:40 (Grady, Lemons, Butch Walker)
12. "Dawn" – 4:00 (Grady)

== Additional information ==
- "Burn It Black" in the video games Project Gotham Racing, MX 2002 Featuring Ricky Carmichael, Backyard Wrestling Don't Try This At Home and on the soundtrack to the film The Scorpion King
- The track "I-IV-V" was featured in the soundtrack of the movie Spider-Man.
- "Faithless" appeared on the second soundtrack to the movie The Fast and the Furious, More Fast and Furious. The song also made it onto the soundtrack for the MTV reality wrestling show Tough Enough.
- There is a hidden track on the album called "Ride the Snake" that starts about a minute after "Dawn" is finished.
