= Left of Self-Centered =

Studio album by Butch Walker
- Released: July 9, 2002
- Studios: Ruby Red Productions, Stonehenge Recording, Sonica Recording (Atlanta, Georgia)
- Genres: Pop rock, pop punk
- Length: 50:36
- Labels: BMG, Arista Records
- Producers: Butch Walker, Jim Ebert, Matt Mahaffey

Butch Walker chronology
Left of Self-Centered (2002)	Heartwork EP (2004)

Professional ratings
Review scores
Source	Rating
Allmusic	3/5 stars
Sputnikmusic	4.5/5 stars

Left of Self-Centered is the debut studio album by Butch Walker, released on July 9, 2002, on BMG and Arista Records.

== Track listing ==
All songs written by Butch Walker.

1. "Rock Vocal Power" – 1:56
2. "My Way" – 4:00
3. "Suburbia" – 4:07
4. "Trouble" – 3:58
5. "Alicia Amnesia" – 3:42
6. "Sober" – 3:20
7. "Into the Black" – 3:38
8. "Get Down" – 4:03
9. "Far Away From Close" – 3:52
10. "Diary Of A San Fernando Sexx Star" – 3:39
11. "If (Jeannie's Song)" – 4:53
12. "Take Tomorrow (One Day At A Time)" – 4:30
13. "15 Minutes Blank (no Music)" - 14:58
14. "Get Stupid With With You" (hidden track) – 4:58

=== Bonus track ===
The Japanese release of the album featured a "Queen Medley", recorded live in Atlanta, Georgia, as a bonus track. The song was later released in the United States on Walker's Cover Me Badd EP (2005).

== Personnel ==
- Kenny Cresswell – drums, backing vocals
- Jim Ebert – moog synth, keyboards
- Greg Lee – bass
- Chrystina Lloree – backing vocals
- Matt Mahaffey – beats, keys, gratuitous hip-hop style scratching
- Mitch "Slug" McLee – drums on "Into the Black"
- Peter Searcy – cello
- Harold Sellers – congas
- Nikki Sixx – bass
- Butch Walker – vocals, guitar, bass, piano, programming, keyboards, percussion
