= SouthGang =

American rock band

- Also known as: Byte the Bullet
- Origin: Rome, Georgia, U.S.
- Genres: Hard rock, heavy metal, glam metal
- Years active: 1988–1993
- Past members: Jesse Harte; Butch Walker; Jayce Fincher; Mitch McLee

SouthGang was a Los Angeles–based rock band composed of lead vocalist Jesse Harte, guitarist Butch Walker, bassist Jayce Fincher, and drummer Mitch "Slug" McLee, active in the late 1980s and early 1990s. The band's original name, Byte the Bullet, was changed to SouthGang before they released their first album, Tainted Angel. They had a similar style to many of the other "hair bands" of the era. The band is best remembered for their 1991 single "Tainted Angel," which received some MTV airplay, especially during Headbangers Ball.

Tainted Angel was produced by Howard Benson and Desmond Child.

After the band's breakup in the early-1990s, Walker, Fincher, and McLee went on to form Floyd's Funk Revival later becoming The Floyds before creating the power pop band Marvelous 3, scoring a minor hit with "Freak of the Week" in 1998.

More recently, Walker has had a successful solo music career, as well as written and produced hits for many of today's pop and rock artists such as Fall Out Boy, Panic! at the Disco and Bowling for Soup.

Harte is currently residing in the Atlanta area, working in the cell phone industry. He released an EP in 2012 with a project called Red Bloody Hearts.

McLee is still playing drums in Atlanta, Georgia.

== Band members ==
- Jesse Harte – vocals
- Butch Walker – guitars, talkbox, backing vocals
- Jayce Fincher – bass, backing vocals
- Mitch "Slug" McLee – drums, percussion

== Discography ==
=== Studio albums ===
- Tainted Angel (1991)
- Group Therapy (1992)

=== Live album ===
- SouthGang: Live in Heaven – bootleg live album from May 29, 1991

== Singles ==
- "Love Ain't Enough" from Tainted Angel
- "Love For Sale" from Tainted Angel
- "Tainted Angel" from Tainted Angel
- "Fire In Your Body" from Group Therapy
- "Tug of War" from Group Therapy
