= Letters (Butch Walker album) =

Studio album by Butch Walker
- Released: August 24, 2004
- Studio: Ruby Red Productions (Atlanta, Georgia)
- Genres: Rock, pop rock
- Length: 51:12
- Label: Epic
- Producers: Jim Ebert; Butch Walker

Butch Walker chronology
Heartwork EP (2004)	Letters (2004)	This Is Me... Justified and Stripped (2004)

Professional ratings
Review scores
Source	Rating
AbsolutePunk.net	(89%) link
Allmusic	link

Letters is the second full-length album by Butch Walker, released on August 24, 2004 on Epic Records. It featured an enhanced CD portion with the music videos to "Mixtape" and "Don't Move".

== Track listing ==
All tracks are written by Butch Walker unless otherwise noted.

No.	Title	Writer(s)	Length
1.	"Sunny Day Real Estate"		0:28
2.	"Maybe It's Just Me"		3:20
3.	"Mixtape"		4:05
4.	"#1 Summer Jam"		3:28
5.	"So at Last"	Walker; Danny Grady	5:28
6.	"Uncomfortably Numb"		3:33
7.	"Joan"		4:20
8.	"Don't Move"		4:08
9.	"Lights Out"		2:51
10.	"Best Thing You Never Had"		5:29
11.	"Race Cars and Goth Rock"		3:02
12.	"Promise"		3:04
13.	"Thank-You Note"		7:48

- There is an acoustic hidden track titled "State Line" at the end of "Thank-You Note"

Japan bonus tracks
No.	Title	Length
14.	"Last Flight Out"	3:46
15.	"My Best Friend's Magic Girlfriend"	3:25

== Personnel ==
- Fran Capitinelli – electric guitar, B-Bender
- Kenny Cresswell – drums
- Dan Dixon – lapsteel
- Jim Ebert – synthesizer, backing vocals, percussion, Hammond organ, moog, organ
- Danny Grady – electric guitar, bass, backing vocals
- JT Hall – bass
- Joey Huffman – wurlitzer, Hammond organ, organ, piano, Mellotron
- Sean Loughlin – turntables
- Rick Richards – electric guitar, slide guitar
- Morgan Rose – drums
- Joe Stark – electric guitar
- Mickey Wade – whistle, congas
- Butch Walker – vocals, backing vocals, acoustic guitar, electric guitar, bass, percussion, slide guitar, vibes, piano, timpani
- Bobby Yang – strings, violin

=== Production ===
- George Marino – engineer, mixing, producer
- Russ-T Cobb – engineer
- Sheri G. Lee – art direction
- Alan Ferguson – photography
