= About Love (album) =

Studio album by Plastiscines
- Released: 4 August 2009
- Recorded: 2009
- Genre: Indie rock
- Length: 39:24
- Label: Nylon
- Producer: Butch Walker; Jake Sinclair; Claudius Mittendorfer

Plastiscines chronology
LP1 (2007)	About Love (2009)	Back to the Start (2014)

Professional ratings
Review scores
Source	Rating
Allmusic	3/5 stars

About Love is the second studio album by French female band, the Plastiscines.

About Love was recorded in Los Angeles in February 2009. It contains twelve tracks including the singles "Barcelona", "Bitch" and "I Am Down" which were featured in the episode "They Shoot Humphreys, Don't They?" (Episode 9, of the Third Season) of Gossip Girl. Its highest chart position in France was 138th. It fell out in 179th place on 22 February 2010. The French edition of Rolling Stone classified it as the 100th best French rock Album.

== Track listing ==
1. "I Could Rob You" – 3:26
2. "Barcelona" – 3:21
3. "Bitch" – 3:07
4. "Camera" – 2:25
5. "From Friends to Lovers" – 2:56
6. "Time to Leave" – 3:51
7. "I Am Down" – 4:11
8. "Another Kiss" – 2:54
9. "Pas Avec Toi" – 2:58
10. "Runnaway" – 3:43
11. "You're No Good" (Clint Ballard, Jr) – 3:06
12. "Coney Island" – 3:26

== Personnel ==
- Louise Basilien – bass
- Katty Besnard – guitar, vocals
- Marine Neuilly – guitar
- Anais Vandevyvere – drums

=== Production ===
- Kevin Bosley – assistant
- Alex Chow – artwork, design
- Scott Hull – mastering
- Marvin Scott Jarrett – photography
- Claudius Mittendorfer – mixing
- Jake Sinclair – producer
- Butch Walker – producer, audio production
