= Stay Gold (Butch Walker album) =

Studio album by Butch Walker
- Released: August 26, 2016
- Genres: Rock & roll, country rock, Americana
- Length: 43:09
- Labels: Dangerbird, Lojinx

Butch Walker chronology
Afraid of Ghosts (2015)	Stay Gold (2016)	American Love Story (2020)

Professional ratings
Aggregate scores
Source	Rating
Metacritic	80/100
Review scores
Source	Rating
The A.V. Club	B+
AllMusic	4.5/5 stars

Stay Gold is the eighth full-length studio album from American musician Butch Walker, released on August 26, 2016, through DangerBird records in the United States and Lojinx in Europe. The album was announced in June of that year with the lead single “East Coast Girl”.

Following his previous release, Afraid of Ghosts, an emotional album recorded after the loss of his father, Stay Gold presents a much more upbeat and optimistic outlook, with Walker saying "I spilled it all out on [Afraid of Ghosts] and it was a heavy subject. Where do you go from there? [...] It triggered a lot of bittersweet nostalgia. So I started writing about all that, and it sounded like the template should be more of a celebration, as far as the music goes."

== Background and production ==
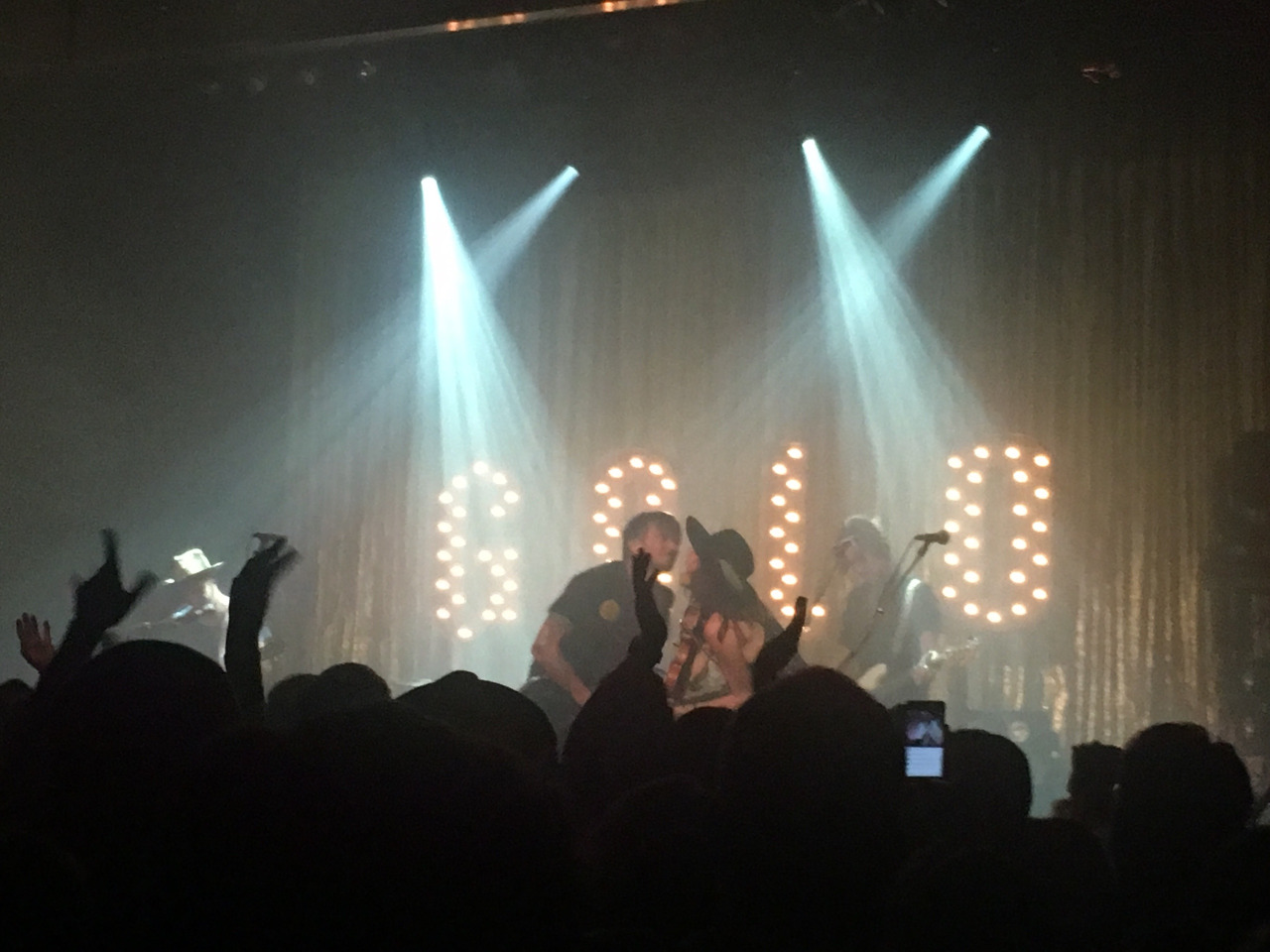
Walker on tour at Minneapolis' Varsity Theater on September 11, 2016

Walker cites the 1983 film The Outsiders as a major thematic influence for the record, echoing his own small town childhood, with the title referencing the line spoken by Johnny Cade to Ponyboy Curtis, "Stay gold, Ponyboy. Stay gold."

== Track listing ==
No.	Title	Writer(s)	Length
1.	"Stay Gold"	Butch Walker	3:57
2.	"East Coast Girl"	Walker	4:18
3.	"Wilder in the Heart"	Walker	3:49
4.	"Ludlow Expectations"	Walker	4:47
5.	"Descending" (featuring Ashley Monroe)	Walker, Monroe	4:16
6.	"Irish Exit"	Walker	3:58
7.	"Mexican Coke"	Walker	4:10
8.	"Can We Just Not Talk About Last Night?"	Walker	4:28
9.	"Spark: Lost"	Walker	4:30
10.	"Record Store"	Walker	4:56

== Personnel ==
Credits adapted from AllMusic.

Musicians

- Ryan Adams – guitar, piano
- Daniel Donato – guitar
- Gavin Fitzjohn – horn
- Roger Manning – keyboards, piano, background vocals
- Ashley Monroe – vocals
- Steven "Doc" Patt – accordion, bass guitar, upright bass, slide guitar, background vocals
- Suzanne Santo – violin, background vocals
- Mark Stepro – drums, background vocals
- Butch Walker – bass guitar, guitar, keyboards, organ, percussion, piano, vocals

Technical personnel

- Michael Brauer – mixing
- Pete Lyman – mastering
- Todd Stopera – engineer

== Charts ==
Chart (2015)	Peak position
US Billboard 200	143
US Americana/Folk Albums (Billboard)	4
US Independent Albums (Billboard)	10
US Top Rock Albums (Billboard)	10
US Indie Store Album Sales (Billboard)	11
US Vinyl Albums (Billboard)	12
