= More Fast and Furious =

More Fast and Furious: Music from and Inspired by the Motion Picture The Fast and the Furious

Soundtrack album by Various artists
- Released: December 18, 2001
- Genres: Alternative metal; nu metal; post-grunge; electronica
- Length: 51:06
- Label: Island

More Fast and Furious: Music from and Inspired by the Motion Picture The Fast and the Furious is the second of two soundtracks for the film The Fast and the Furious. It was originally released on December 18, 2001, by Island Records. In contrast to the hip hop-oriented first soundtrack, this album contains alternative metal and nu metal songs, as well as selected tracks from the film score composed by BT.

== Track listing ==
1. "Superstar" (Saliva) – 4:08
2. "Faithless" (Injected) – 3:21
3. "Crawling in the Dark" (Hoobastank) – 2:56
4. "Dominic's Story" (BT) – 1:45
5. "This Life" (Primer 55) – 3:28
6. "Crashing Around You" (Machine Head) – 3:14
7. "Idi Banashapan" (Roni Size) – 4:15
8. "Lock It Down" (Digital Assassins) – 3:50
9. "Race Wars" (BT) – 3:18
10. "Click Click Boom" (Saliva) – 4:13
11. "Shelter" (Greenwheel) – 3:37
12. "Watch Your Back" (Benny Cassette) – 3:03
13. "Polkas Palabras" (Molotov) – 3:23
14. "The Fast and the Furious Theme" (BT) – 6:35

== Not included on the soundtrack ==
The following songs are featured in the film or its promotional material but not on any of its soundtrack albums:

1. "9 Teen 90 Nine" (Limp Bizkit) – Played on the teaser trailer
2. "My Way" (Limp Bizkit) – Played on the main theatrical trailer.
3. "Rollin' (Air Raid Vehicle)" (Limp Bizkit) – Played during the first street racer gathering. The "Urban Assault Vehicle" remix, which was not used in the film, is available on the first soundtrack.
4. "Evil Ways" (Santana) – Played at Toretto's barbecue party.
5. "Debonaire" (Dope) – Used in the montage scene of Toretto's team fixing up the Supra while Johnny Tran's home is raided by the FBI.
6. "Deep Enough (Remix)" (Live) – Played during Brian's intro at start of film.
7. "Area Codes" (Ludacris) – Used when Brian and Mia meet at Dom's house after the street race
8. "Fourth Floor" (Brian Tyler) – Played at the beginning of the film when Brian tests his Eclipse. Also played when Brian and Dom chase down Johnny Tran and Lance Nguyen on their motorcycles.
9. "Nocturnal Transmission" (BT) – Played during 'night time' activities at Race Wars.
10. "Nurega" (Organic Audio) – Played at Dom's house after the street race.
11. "Say Ah" (Shawnna) – Played when the cars are coming together for the street race scene.
12. "Mercedes Benz" (Say Yes) – Played when Brian and Dom are fixing the Supra
13. "Atrevido" (Orishas) – Played when Brian and Mia were having dinner at the Cuban restaurant.

== Criticism ==
The album was criticized by listeners for its use of copy-protection software, which rendered it unplayable not only on computers with CD-ROM drives, but also on regular CD players and other CD-based devices.

== Year-end charts ==
Year-end chart performance for More Fast and Furious
| Chart (2002) | Position |
|---|---|
| Canadian Alternative Albums (Nielsen SoundScan) | 119 |
| Canadian Metal Albums (Nielsen SoundScan) | 57 |
