= LP1 (Plastiscines album) =

Studio album by Plastiscines
- Released: 12 February 2007
- Studios: Studio Calm, Paris
- Genre: Rock
- Label: Virgin France
- Producers: Maxime Schmitt; Frank Redlich

Plastiscines chronology
LP1 (2007)	About Love (2009)

Professional ratings
Review scores
Source	Rating
AllMusic	3/5 stars
Pitchfork	7.0/10
PopMatters	7/10

LP1 is the debut studio album by French rock band the Plastiscines. It was released on 12 February 2007 by Virgin France. The album includes the singles "Loser", "Shake (Twist Around the Fire)" and "Rake" which had appeared in 2006 on a compilation of young Parisian bands titled Paris Calling. It reached number 61 on the French chart.

== Track listing ==
1. "Alchemie"
2. "Loser"
3. "Shake (Twist Around the Fire)"
4. "Mister Driver"
5. "La règle du jeu"
6. "Zazie fait de la bicyclette"
7. "No Way"
8. "Pop In, Pop Out!"
9. "Rake"
10. "Tu as tout prévu"
11. "Human Rights"
12. "Lost in Translation"
13. "Under Control"

== Charts ==
Chart (2007)	Peak position
French Albums (SNEP)	61
