= Marvelous 3 =

American rock band

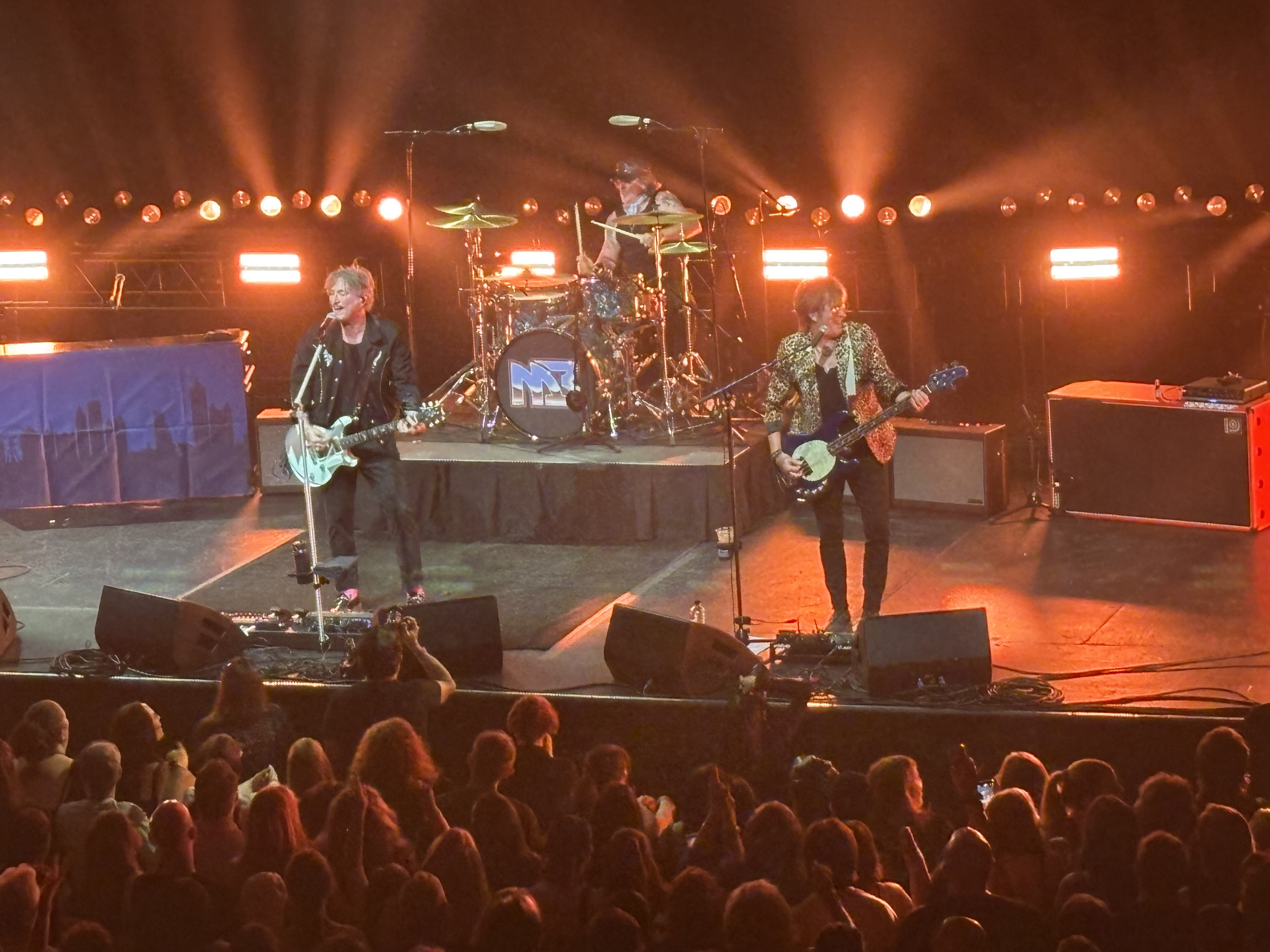
- Marvelous 3 performing in 2025

Background information
- Origin: Atlanta, Georgia, U.S.
- Genres: Power pop; alternative rock; pop-punk
- Years active: 1997–2001; 2023–present
- Labels: Deep South; Marvelous; Elektra
- Members: Jayce Fincher; Doug "Slug" Mitchell; Butch Walker
- Website: butchwalker.com

Marvelous 3 is an American rock band formed in Atlanta, Georgia in 1997. They have released four studio albums, and they are best known for their 1998 song "Freak of the Week." The band released three albums during their initial career: Math and Other Problems (1997), Hey! Album (1998), and ReadySexGo (2000). They gained significant popularity through MTV and tours with bands like Blink-182.

The band disbanded in 2001 after a farewell show in Atlanta's Centennial Olympic Park. Guitarist and lead singer Butch Walker subsequently became a highly successful solo artist and producer for acts such as Pink, Weezer, and Fall Out Boy. After a 23-year hiatus, the band reunited in 2023 to release their fourth studio album, IV, and performed several sold-out shows in Atlanta and Chicago.

== History ==
Marvelous 3 was formed by lead singer/guitarist Butch Walker, bass guitarist Jayce Fincher, and drummer Doug Mitchell (a.k.a. Mitch "Slug" McLee). All three band members had played together previously in glam outfit SouthGang, Floyds Funk Revival, and The Floyds, before reemerging as Marvelous 3 in 1997 when they released their first album, Math and Other Problems, which would sell just over 4,000 copies by January 2000.

The band's most successful album – Hey! Album – was released in the fall of 1998, with the lead single "Freak of the Week" reaching number 5 on Billboard's Modern Rock Tracks chart and number 23 on the Mainstream Rock Tracks chart. The band toured with bands such as Collective Soul, SR-71, Dynamite Hack, and Train, and appeared on the WB television show Charmed. By 2000, Hey! Album had sold 90,000 copies in the US.

The band acrimoniously separated from label Elektra Records in spring 2001, as Walker documented on the band's official website in April 2001:

There has been an incredible amount of "lack of interest" for the band over at Elektra ('cough, ahem, Neglectra, cough, cough') Records lately, and that comes as no surprise, seeing that every record they put out most recently, sinks like a dead, anchored body in the Hudson River...Well, the time has come. We are free from Elektra. I asked them to let us go, and they did. WE DID NOT GET DROPPED.. I ASKED TO LEAVE.

Following a final tour, in which the band headlined the Atlanta Music Midtown festival in May 2001, they ended with a final farewell show at Atlanta's Centennial Olympic Park in August 2001. By their breakup, the band's Elektra albums had sold a combined total of 133,000 copies, with their last album ReadySexGo selling 32,216 copies.

Butch Walker went on to become a successful solo artist, songwriter, and record producer, creating hit records for Avril Lavigne, Bowling for Soup, Pink, Fall Out Boy, Lit, and SR-71.

Marvelous 3 reunited with an advertised appearance at The Autumn Leaves benefit show on November 4, 2018, and performed a six-song set at the end of Butch Walker's solo headlining set, after having only played together at a handful of Butch's Atlanta solo shows since 2001.

On April 25, 2023, Butch Walker announced on Atlanta's 99X that the band was getting back together for a new album, a re-release of "Hey Album," and a show on October 27, 2023, at the Tabernacle in Atlanta. This then turned into three sold-out shows at the Tabernacle and two subsequent shows at Chicago's House of Blues.

The band released a new studio album, IV, on October 13, 2023, after a 23-year hiatus.

== Band members ==
- Butch Walker – lead vocals, guitar
- Jayce Fincher – bass guitar
- Doug Mitchell (a.k.a. Mitch "Slug" McLee) – drums

== Discography ==
=== Studio albums ===
- Math and Other Problems (1997)
- Hey! Album (1998)
- ReadySexGo (2000)
- IV (2023)

=== Singles ===
- "Freak of the Week" from Hey! Album – #5 Alternative, #23 Mainstream Rock, #112 Billboard Hot 100, #49 New Zealand top 50
- "Every Monday" from Hey! Album
- "Sugarbuzz" from ReadySexGo
- "Get Over" from ReadySexGo
- "My Old School Metal Heart" from IV
- "If We're On Fire (Let It Burn)" from IV
- "Psalm of the Summer" from Book of Psalms

== Guest appearances ==
Marvelous 3 have had multiple single-night reunions in Atlanta since the band's 2001 split. Most often, Fincher and McLee have joined Butch Walker during encores of his solo shows, resurrecting material from the band's three releases and prior tours.

Walker and Fincher lent background vocals to "Over Tokyo", a track from Collective Soul's 2000 album Blender.
