= Cobra Starship discography =

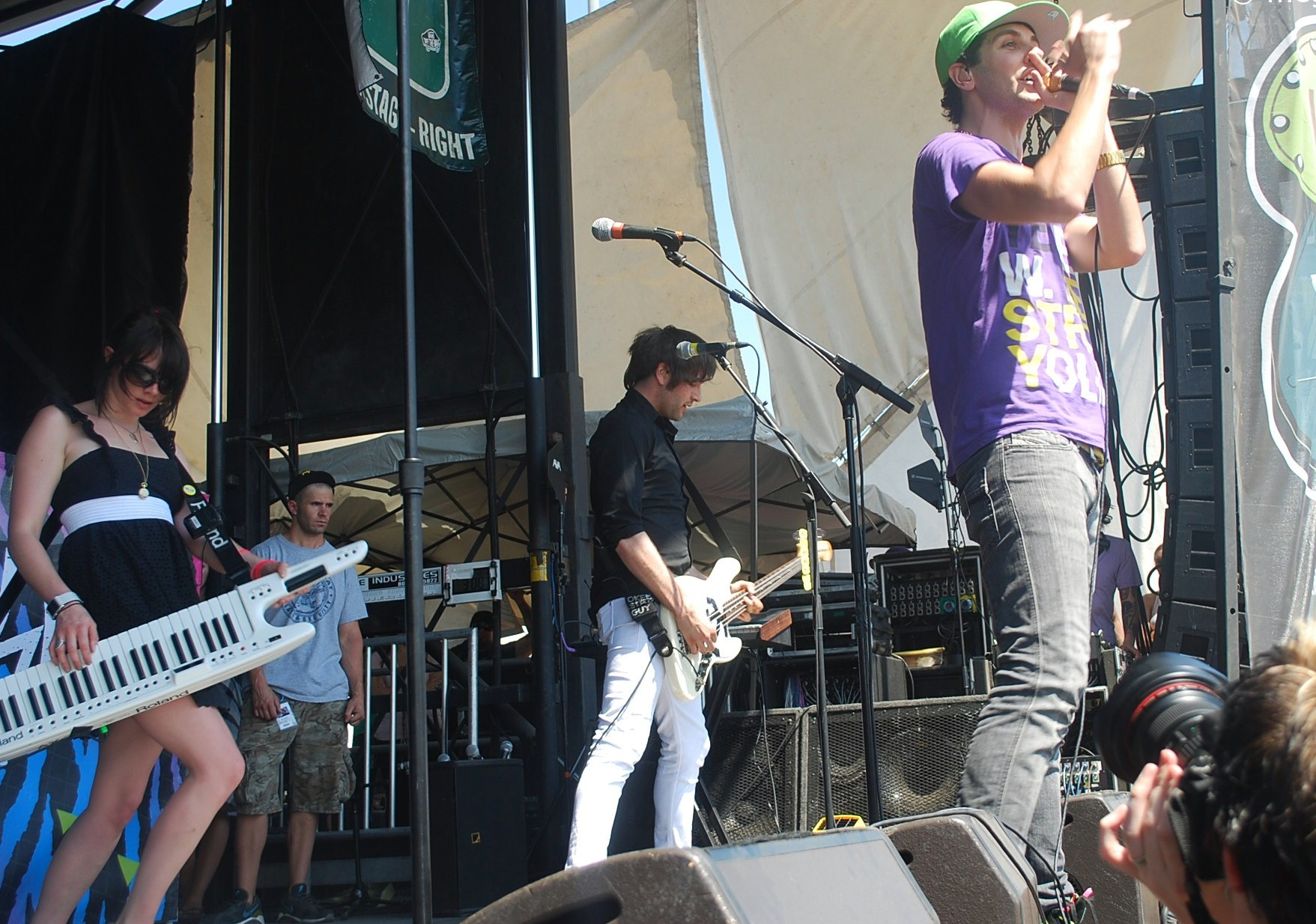
- Cobra Starship performing at Warped Tour on June 20, 2008
- Studio albums: 4
- Extended plays: 2
- Singles: 15
- Music videos: 20
- Album appearances: 8

Cobra Starship was an American pop punk band, formed by Gabe Saporta in 2005. Other members are guitarist Ryland Blackinton, bassist Alex Suarez, drummer Nate Novarro, and keytarist Victoria Asher, all of whom provide backing vocals. The group released their debut album, While the City Sleeps, We Rule the Streets in 2006. Their song "Bring It" was retitled "Snakes on a Plane (Bring It)" in order to be included on the soundtrack album Snakes on a Plane: The Album.

Gabe's friendship with Pete Wentz earned them an opening slot on the Fall Out Boy tour. ¡Viva La Cobra!, their second album was released in late 2007. They played MTV Spring Break, Bamboozle East, West, in London, Tokyo and Canada. In January 2009, they started producing their third album, released in August, Hot Mess. The lead single for this album, "Good Girls Go Bad", charted at number two in New Zealand. In late August, 2011, the band released their fourth studio album, Night Shades. The lead single, "You Make Me Feel..." featuring rapper Sabi, debuted at number one in New Zealand.

Their discography consists of four studio albums, fifteen singles, and twenty music videos.

== Studio albums ==
List of albums, with selected chart positions, showing year released and album name
Title	Album details	Peak chart positions									Sales	Certifications
Title	Album details	US	US Alt	US Heat	US Indie	AUS	CAN	JPN	NZ	UK	Sales	Certifications
While the City Sleeps, We Rule the Streets	Released: October 10, 2006; Label: Fueled by Ramen/Decaydance; Format: CD, digital download	125	—	1	7	—	—	—	—	—		
¡Viva la Cobra!	Released: October 23, 2007; Label: Fueled by Ramen/Decaydance; Format: CD, digital download	80	19	—	—	—	—	—	—	—	US: 119,000	
Hot Mess	Released: August 11, 2009; Label: Fueled by Ramen/Decaydance; Format: CD, digital download	4	—	—	— (Note: Hot Mess did not enter the US Independent Albums chart, but peaked at number 14 on the US Billboard Indie Store Albums Sales chart.)	51	14	96	18	188	US: 139,000	RIAA: Gold
Night Shades	Released: August 30, 2011; Label: Fueled by Ramen/Decaydance; Format: CD, digital download	50	—	—	—	— (Note: Night Shades did not enter the ARIA Albums Chart, but peaked at number six on the ARIA Hitseekers Albums Chart.)	—	—	39	—		RMNZ: Gold
"—" denotes a recording that did not chart or was not released in that territory.

== Extended plays ==
Title	Details
I'm a Hot Mess, Help Me	Released: January 12, 2010; Label: Fueled by Ramen/Decaydance; Format: Digital download
iTunes Session	Released: August 23, 2011; Label: Fueled by Ramen; Format: Digital download

== Singles ==
=== As lead artist ===
List of singles with selected chart positions, sales and certifications, showing year released and album name
Title	Year	Peak chart positions										Sales	Certifications	Album
Title	Year	US	AUS	CAN	BEL	FIN	IRE	JPN	NLD	NZ	UK	Sales	Certifications	Album
"Snakes on a Plane (Bring It)" (featuring William Beckett, Travie McCoy and Maja Ivarsson)	2006	— (Note: "Snakes on a Plane (Bring It)" did not enter the Billboard Hot 100, but peaked at number 32 on the US Alternative Airplay chart.)	—	—	—	—	—	—	—	—	98			While the City Sleeps, We Rule the Streets
"Send My Love to the Dancefloor, I'll See You in Hell (Hey Mister DJ)"	2006	—	—	—	—	—	—	—	—	—	—			While the City Sleeps, We Rule the Streets
"The Church of Hot Addiction"	2007	—	—	—	—	—	—	—	—	—	—			While the City Sleeps, We Rule the Streets
"Guilty Pleasure"	2007	—	—	—	—	—	—	—	—	—	—			¡Viva la Cobra!
"The City Is at War"	2007	—	—	—	—	—	—	—	—	—	—			¡Viva la Cobra!
"Kiss My Sass" (featuring Travie McCoy)	2008	—	—	—	—	—	—	—	—	—	—			¡Viva la Cobra!
"Good Girls Go Bad" (featuring Leighton Meester)	2009	7	5	7	54	13	17	47	19	2	17	US: 2,000,000	RIAA: 2× Platinum; ARIA: Platinum; MC: Platinum; RMNZ: Gold	Hot Mess
"Hot Mess"	2009	64	—	58	—	—	—	—	—	40	198		RIAA: Gold	Hot Mess
"You Make Me Feel..." (featuring Sabi)	2011	7	3	4	14	14	12	10	22	1	16	US: 1,400,000	RIAA: 3× Platinum; ARIA: 3× Platinum; IFPI DK: Gold; MC: 2× Platinum; RMNZ: 2× Platinum	Night Shades
"The Future's So Bright, I Gotta Wear Shades"	2011	—	—	—	—	—	—	—	—	—	—			Non-album single
"Middle Finger"^{[A]} (featuring Mac Miller)	2012	— (Note: "Middle Finger" did not enter the Billboard Hot 100, but peaked at number 14 on the Bubbling Under Hot 100 Singles chart, which acts as a 25-song extension to the Hot 100.)	—	55	—	—	—	80	—	—	—			Night Shades
"#1Nite (One Night)" (featuring My Name Is Kay)	2012	— (Note: "#1Nite (One Night)" did not enter the Billboard Hot 100, but peaked at number 23 on the Bubbling Under Hot 100 Singles chart, which acts as a 25-song extension to the Hot 100.)	—	—	—	—	—	—	—	—	—	US: 91,000		Night Shades
"Never Been in Love" (featuring Icona Pop)	2014	—	66	—	114	—	—	—	— (Note: "Never Been in Love" did not enter the Dutch Top 40, but peaked at number five on the Tipparade chart.)	—	—			Non-album singles
"Beautiful Life"	2021	—	—	—	—	—	—	—	—	—	—			Non-album singles
"Party with You"	2021	—	—	—	—	—	—	—	—	—	—			Non-album singles
"—" denotes a recording that did not chart or was not released in that territory.

=== Promotional singles ===
List of promotional singles
Title	Year	Album
"Fool Like Me"	2011	Night Shades
"Don't Blame the World, It's the DJ's Fault"	2011	Night Shades

=== Other appearances ===
List of other appearances, showing year released and album name
Title	Year	Album	Notes
"Awww Dip"	2007	Teenage Mutant Ninja Turtles: Music from the Motion Picture	
"I Kissed a Boy"	2008	Welcome to the New Administration	Parody of Katy Perry's "I Kissed a Girl"
"Interlude"	2008	Welcome to the New Administration	
"Chew Me Up and Spit Me Out"	2009	Jennifer's Body	
"What Happens on the Dancefloor"	2010	Overcome	Collaboration with Alexandra Burke
"Peggy Sue"	2011	Listen to Me: Buddy Holly	Tribute album

== Music videos ==
Title	Year	Director(s)	Ref.
"Snakes on a Plane (Bring It)" (featuring William Beckett, Travis McCoy and Maja Ivarsson)	2006	Lex Halaby	
"The Church of Hot Addiction"	2006	Alan Ferguson	
"Send My Love to the Dancefloor, I'll See You in Hell (Hey Mr. DJ)"	2007	Tue Wallin Storm	
"Guilty Pleasure" (home video)	2007	Victoria Asher	
"The City Is at War"	2007	Whitey McConnaughy	
"Guilty Pleasure"	2008	John Stalberg Jr.	
"Placer Culpable"	2008	John Stalberg Jr.	
"Kiss My Sass" (home video) (featuring Travis McCoy of Gym Class Heroes)	2008	Matt Ornstein and Victoria Asher	
"Good Girls Go Bad"	2009	Kai Regan	
"Wet Hot American Summer"	2009	—N/a	
"Hot Mess"	2009	Kai Regan	
"Hot Mess (Remix)"	2010	Pete Wentz	
"Living In the Sky With Diamonds"	2010	Lewis Cater	
"You Make Me Feel..." (featuring Sabi)	2011	Kai Regan	
"Middle Finger"	2012	Luga Podesta	
"#1Nite (One Night)" (home video) (featuring My Name Is Kay)	2012	Ryland Blackinton	
"#1Nite (One Night)" (featuring My Name Is Kay)	2012	Luga Podesta	
"Never Been in Love"	2014	Ellen von Unwerth	
"Beautiful Life"	2021	Victoria Asher	
"Party With You"	2021	Sean Barrett	
