= While the City Sleeps =

While the City Sleeps may refer to:

- While the City Sleeps (1928 film), an American silent film starring Lon Chaney
- While the City Sleeps (1950 film), a Swedish drama scripted by Ingmar Bergman
- While the City Sleeps (1956 film), an American film noir directed by Fritz Lang
- While the City Sleeps..., a 1986 album by George Benson

== See also ==
- While the City Sleeps, We Rule the Streets, a 2006 album by Cobra Starship
