= ¡Viva la Cobra! =

Studio album by Cobra Starship
- Released: October 23, 2007
- Recorded: Brooklyn, New York
- Genres: Dance-rock; pop punk
- Length: 36:54
- Labels: Fueled by Ramen; Decaydance
- Producer: Patrick Stump

Cobra Starship chronology
| While the City Sleeps, We Rule the Streets (2006) | ¡Viva la Cobra! (2007) | Hot Mess (2009) |

Singles from ¡Viva la Cobra!
- 1. "Guilty Pleasure" Released: October 26, 2007; 2. "The City Is at War" Released: May 9, 2008; 3. "Kiss My Sass" Released: September 29, 2008

¡Viva la Cobra! is the second studio album by American dance-rock band Cobra Starship. The album was released on October 23, 2007. It was produced by Fall Out Boy's Patrick Stump, whose vocals also feature throughout the album. The album peaked at No. 80 on Billboard 200.

== Background ==
Cobra Starship was formed in 2005 after Midtown bassist Gabe Saporta took a trip to the deserts of Arizona. During this time, Saporta went on a "vision quest", spending time with Native American tribes and smoking peyote. He began to create his vision for a new band, a melodic style of music heavily influenced by synthpop and hip-hop. Upon returning home, Saporta rented a house in the Catskill Mountains and began writing what would become the band's debut album, While the City Sleeps, We Rule the Streets. He posted a parody response to Gwen Stefani's "Hollaback Girl" titled "Hollaback Boy" on Myspace. The song gained Saporta notoriety on the internet and he eventually signed to Fall Out Boy bassist Pete Wentz's label, Decaydance Records.

Midtown's management company soon set Saporta up with an opportunity to record a song for the soundtrack to the 2006 Snakes on a Plane. Along with members of The Academy Is..., Gym Class Heroes, and The Sounds, Saporta recorded "Snakes on a Plane (Bring It)", which became a minor hit. During the recording of While the City Sleeps, We Rule the Streets, Saporta began recruiting new members to complete the group's lineup. He first enlisted drummer Nate Navarro, whom he met on tour while Navarro sold merchandise for fellow touring act Hidden In Plain View. After seeing Saporta in Entertainment Weekly, guitarist Ryland Blackinton and bassist Alex Suarez, who lived in the same apartment building as Midtown drummer Rob Hitt, emailed Saporta asking to join the group. Keytarist Elisa Schwartz was replaced by Victoria Asher in December 2006, after Saporta had had enough of Schwartz bringing random people onto the tour bus and hosting dance parties while playing Britney Spears music. Saporta also mentioned that Schwartz was suspected of stealing bassist Alex Suarez's iPod.

== Recording and production ==
While on the 2007 Honda Civic Tour, the group began writing music together. The members recorded their individual parts on their laptops in the band's bus. By the time Cobra Starship entered the studio to work on a new album, much of the material was already written. The album was recorded in twenty days at Mission Sound Studios in Brooklyn, New York. It was produced by Patrick Stump of Fall Out Boy.

== Music and lyrics ==
The album's production quality is considered to be an improvement over its predesessor. Alternative Press categorized the album as "scene music", and described its sound as "remarkably reminiscent of the music you would play if the world was coming to an end in a burst of electronic splendor and a rainbow of skinny jeans." MTV described the album as "11 tracks of unabashed party jams, full of big hooky electropop, super-produced guitar crunch and the occasional T-Pain-style vocoder thrown in for good measure." "Smile for the Paparazzi" contains Latin influences, and "introduces a touch of Spanish heat to a thoroughly Americanized album".

Philadelphia-based gay hip-hop trio V.I.P appears on "Damn You Look Good and I'm Drunk (Scandalous)". Blackinton commented on the collaboration, stating, "V.I.P. are the best. Seriously. They're these dudes from Philly...and they write hard-core gay rap songs. And we had 'Scandalous,' and we thought it would be a good idea to have them come in and just offer their vocal talents. It was probably the most awesome thing we've ever done."

The majority of the lyrics on ¡Viva la Cobra! are inspired by Cobra Starship's rise to fame. Saporta explained "All of us played in punk-rock bands growing up, and we could never have dreamed of having this level of celebrity...On one hand, it's awesome because you're hanging out with all your friends, you're getting the VIP treatment. But then you also see how it's just like this big [flattery] convention. And the record is sort of about that contradiction, where on one hand you wanna have fun and party, but at the same time, it's a critique of that whole lifestyle." "Damn You Look Good and I'm Drunk (Scandalous)", which was originally titled "Fake Boobs and Rollerblades", discusses trashy women who the band often met at parties.

== Title ==
Through the Fueled by Ramen street team, the band allowed members of the street team to choose between two possible song titles for five different songs on the record. The album was originally going to be called If the World Is Ending, We're Throwing the Party; however, singer Gabe Saporta stated that:

We all LOVED the title If the World Is Ending, We're Throwing the Party (it's actually a line from what I think will be [the first song we put out,] Guilty Pleasure). But everyone was having a hard time remembering it (they were like, "what is it again? If the world is gonna end, then we're gonna….? etc. )

And we were on tour in Europe with like 3 days left to decide on a title. We had an overnight flight from Singapore with Gym Class Heroes and The Academy Is... where we didn't sleep and were deliriously coming up with a whole bunch of titles (some of the top runners: Shred Savage, Cobra Lingus, Sass Attack, Holiday in Cambrodia, Bromeo and Juliet, you get the idea..)

Then we get to Africa for Decaydance Fest and me, Pete, and Patrick are backstage struggling and brain-storming to try to find something that can work. And in pops Travis distracting everyone and talking a million miles a minute about some shit about Lil Wayne rapping with GCH and putting in "Viva La White Girl" at the front of "Clothes Off." And I was like, "oh shit! How about Viva La Cobra!?" Travis gave me this "come-on-are-you-serious?" look. But everyone loved it. And since we're like family, he had to let me do it so it's all good. But Travis said I gotta pay him 75 bucks.

== Release ==
"Guilty Pleasure" was released on October 26, 2007, as the lead single from the album. A home video was released prior on the Fueled by Ramen channel. A music video for "The City Is at War" was released on December 31, 2007. It was released as the album's second single on May 9, 2008. The official music video for "Guilty Pleasure" premiered on May 6, 2008, and features a cameo appearance by Patrick Stump. The third and final single, "Kiss My Sass" was released on September 29, 2008. The music video for the song premiered on December 5, 2008, via FNMTV.

== Critical reception ==
Professional ratings
Review scores
| Source | Rating |
|---|---|
| AbsolutePunk.net | (69%) |
| AllMusic | 2.5/5 stars |
| Alternative Press | 4/5 stars |
| Contactmusic.com | (favorable) |
| Drowned in Sound | (4/10) |
| Entertainment Weekly | B |
| IGN | (6.1/10) |
| Spin | (5/10) |

Critical response to ¡Viva la Cobra! was generally mixed to positive. Luke O'Neil of Alternative Press enjoyed the disc's "party-at-the-end-of-the-world" style, and stated that "Contemporary emo-pop sensibilities meet ’80s party abandon on this record, and neither have sounded so enjoyable in years." Mikael Wood of Entertainment Weekly gave the album a "B" grade, and concluded that the album improved upon its predecessor with "catchier hooks and harder-rocking beats". Jon Young of Spin praised Viva la Cobra's catchy nature, but felt that the album suffered from over-production, explaining "Sadly, the glitzy overkill production by Fall Out Boy's Patrick Stump nearly obliterates any potential dance-rock charm. Despite killer hooks, 'Guilty Pleasure' and 'The City Is at War' leave an artificial aftertaste." Andrew Leahey of Allmusic opined that the album was overly repetitive, commenting "There's enough melody here to satisfy most lingering fans...But even Stump can't give the band another sure-fire hit, as all the dance-pop numbers end up repeating the same steps in an attempt to perfect the one routine Cobra Starship knows how to do."

== Track listing ==
| No. | Title | Length |
|---|---|---|
| 1. | "The City Is at War" | 2:51 |
| 2. | "Guilty Pleasure" | 3:22 |
| 3. | "One Day, Robots Will Cry" | 3:40 |
| 4. | "Kiss My Sass" (featuring Travie McCoy) | 3:41 |
| 5. | "Damn You Look Good and I'm Drunk (Scandalous)" (featuring V.I.P.) | 3:51 |
| 6. | "The World Has Its Shine (But I Would Drop It on a Dime)" | 3:25 |
| 7. | "Smile for the Paparazzi" | 3:21 |
| 8. | "Angie" | 3:54 |
| 9. | "Prostitution Is the World's Oldest Profession (And I, Dear Madame, Am a Professional)" | 2:38 |
| 10. | "My Moves Are White (White Hot, That Is)" | 3:55 |
| 11. | "Pleasure Ryland" | 2:17 |

iTunes bonus tracks
| No. | Title | Length |
|---|---|---|
| 12. | "Three Times a Lady" (Commodores cover) | 2:44 |
| 13. | "Placer Culpable" (Spanish version of 'Guilty Pleasures') | 3:12 |

== Charts ==
Chart performance for ¡Viva la Cobra!
| Chart (2007) | Peak position |
|---|---|
| US Billboard 200 | 80 |
| US Top Alternative Albums (Billboard) | 19 |
