= Snakes on a Plane (Bring It) =

2006 single by Cobra Starship

Single by Cobra Starship featuring William Beckett, Travie McCoy and Maja Ivarsson

from the album Snakes on a Plane: The Album and While the City Sleeps, We Rule the Streets
- Released: August 28, 2006
- Genre: Pop-punk; emo
- Length: 3:19
- Label: New Line; Decaydance; Fueled by Ramen
- Songwriters: Sam Hollander; Dave Katz; Travie McCoy; Gabe Saporta
- Producer: S*A*M and Sluggo

Cobra Starship singles chronology
"Snakes on a Plane (Bring It)" (2006)	"The Church of Hot Addiction" (2006)

William Beckett singles chronology
"Snakes on a Plane (Bring It)" (2006)	"Benny & Joon" (2013)

Travie McCoy singles chronology
"Snakes on a Plane (Bring It)" (2006)	"Daylight" (2008)

Maja Ivarsson singles chronology
"Snakes on a Plane (Bring It)" (2006)	"Mitt bästa for dig" (2012)

"Snakes on a Plane (Bring It)", also referred to as "Bring It (Snakes on a Plane)", is the debut single by Cobra Starship, released on August 28, 2006, as the main single from the soundtrack to the film Snakes on a Plane. In addition to Cobra Starship vocalist Gabe Saporta, the song features William Beckett of the Academy Is..., Travie McCoy of Gym Class Heroes, and Maja Ivarsson of the Sounds.

== Background ==
Gabe Saporta spoke about how the song came together in a 2006 interview with Entertainment Weekly:

"The last Midtown record, for me, was really introspective. It made me go off into the desert. I went on this whole retreat trip where I was contemplating my life. And when I was in the desert I got bitten by this snake, and I saw a UFO, and the snake spoke to me. He's, like, 'Yo, man, you've got to stop taking yourself so seriously, you've got to start having some fun.' And I came back and started Cobra Starship in honor of the snake that bit me."

== Composition ==
Saporta began writing "Snakes on a Plane (Bring It)" when Pete Wentz and Jonathan Daniel of Crush Music approached him and thought that the song "would be perfect" for the soundtrack. They got in contact with the film's music supervisor and needed to change some parts to the song. However, Saporta wasn't on board with the idea at first, but eventually "knew it had to be done." Before being rewritten specifically for the film, the song was titled "Bring It".

For the version used in the music video, a line of Samuel L. Jackson saying "That's it! I have had it with these motherfucking snakes on this motherfucking plane!" was added at the beginning of the song.

== Critical reception ==
Brian Schiller of Slant Magazine stated that the track, "will probably never be heard from again after Snakes on a Plane leaves theaters... 'Snakes on a Plane (Bring It)', should honestly be one of the worst songs of the year but isn't via its association to the film. If Snakes on a Plane is nearly as campy as it promises to be, then the song's already dated production fits too perfectly for the song to be in the wrong at all."

== Music video ==
The video, directed by Lex Halaby, shows McCoy, Ivarsson, Saporta and Beckett walking through Honolulu International Airport, acting as if they were villains hired by Eddie Kim (the antagonist of Snakes on a Plane) sneaking snakes on board in their suitcase and guitar case. They are able to pass through security when Ivarsson distracts the airport worker by taking off her jacket. Pete Wentz of Fall Out Boy makes a cameo appearance (at 1:46), talking on a payphone nervously as the band members pass ominously. Samuel L. Jackson (who plays Neville Flynn, the main protagonist of the movie) also makes a cameo appearance, lowering his shades and eyeing the band members as they pass, unaware of the true contents inside their cases before returning to his 100 Bullets comic. He is also seen wearing the unofficial Snakes on a Plane T-shirt designed by webcomic artist Jeffrey Rowland (with snakes flying a plane). The video ends with a sign for South Pacific Airlines Flight 121 as the band boards the plane, the same flight as in the film.

The video was filmed at the Air Hollywood sound stage in San Fernando, California.

== Charts ==
Chart performance for "Snakes on a Plane (Bring It)"
Chart (2006)	Peak position
UK Singles (Official Charts)	98
US Alternative Airplay (Billboard)	32

== Release history ==
Release dates and formats for "Snakes on a Plane (Bring It)"
Region	Date	Format	Label	Ref.
Various	August 28, 2006	Digital download	New Line; Decaydance; Fueled by Ramen	
