= Cobra Starship =

American band

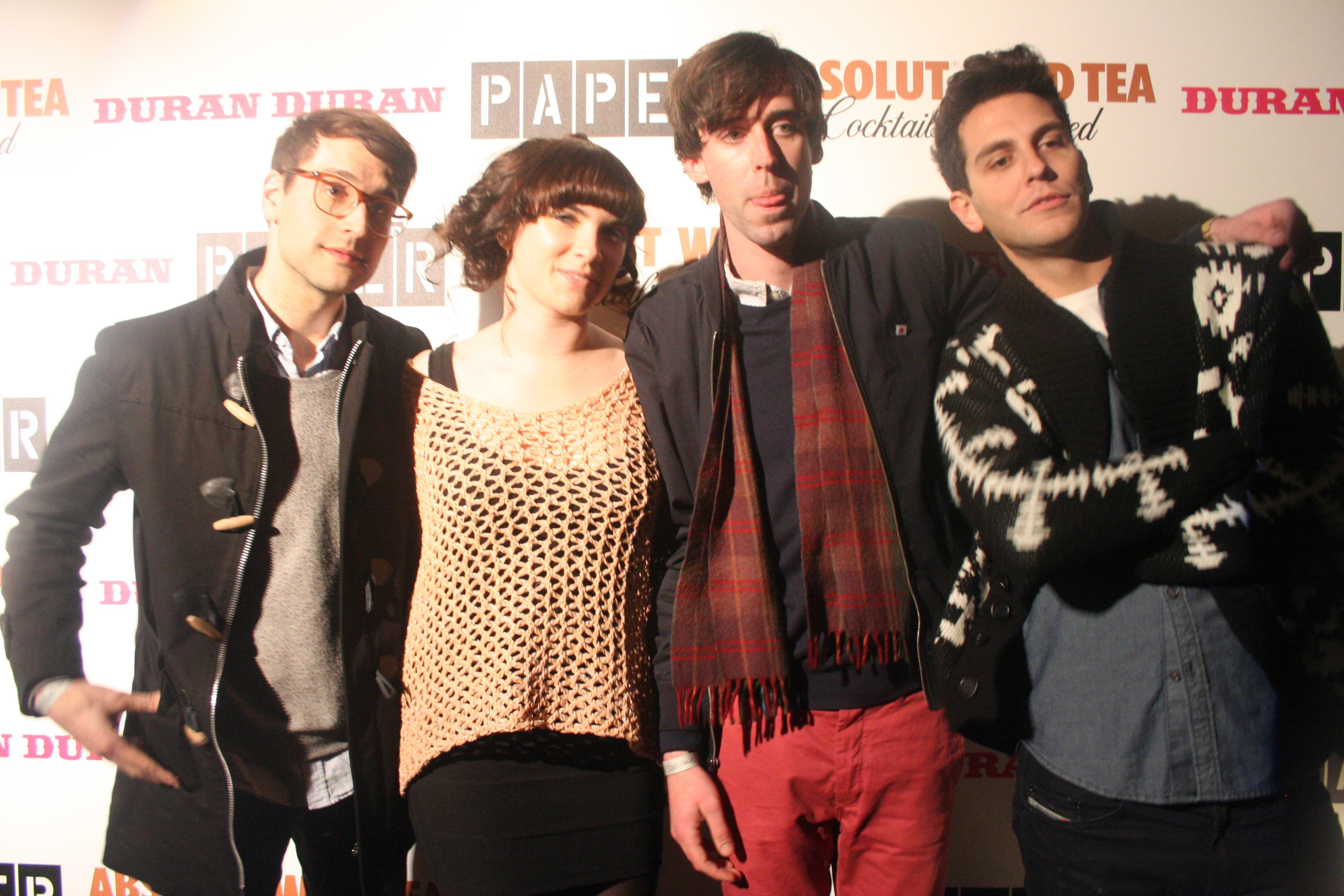
- Cobra Starship at the Paper Magazine Beautiful People Party in 2011

Background information
- Origin: New York City, New York, U.S.
- Genres: Dance-rock; electropop; pop-punk; synth-pop
- Years active: 2005–2015; 2021; 2024–present
- Labels: Decaydance; Fueled by Ramen
- Spinoff of: Midtown
- Members: Gabe Saporta; Victoria Asher; Nate Novarro
- Past members: Ryland Blackinton; Alex Suarez; Eric Halvorsen; Andy Barr; Elisa Jordana
- Website: cobrastarship.com
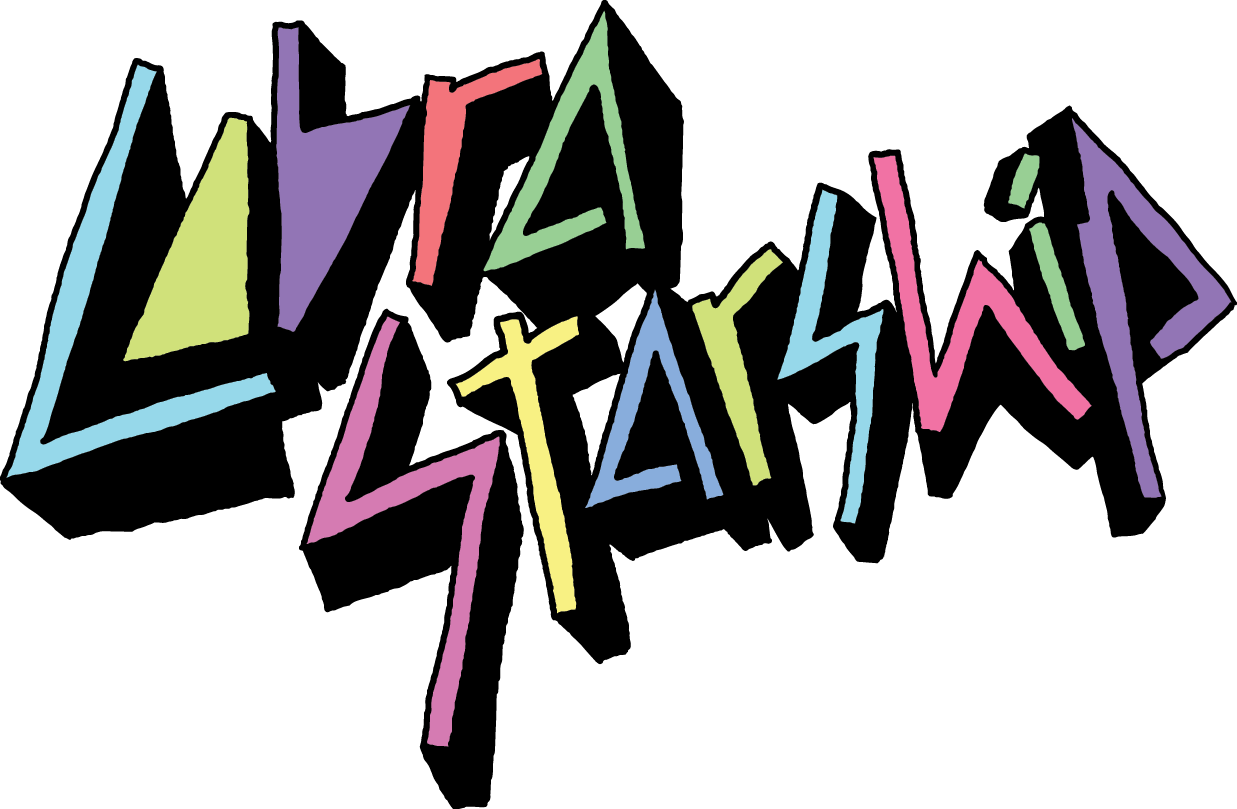

Cobra Starship is an American dance-rock band formed in New York City, New York, in 2005 by Gabe Saporta. He recorded the first album as a solo project, While the City Sleeps, We Rule the Streets. Saporta later enlisted guitarist Ryland Blackinton, bassist Alex Suarez, drummer Nate Novarro, and keytarist Victoria Asher, all of whom provide backing vocals.

Over the course of ten years, Cobra Starship produced four albums and two Billboard Hot 100 top 10 singles. The group released its debut album, While the City Sleeps, We Rule the Streets, in 2006, which contained the single "Snakes on a Plane (Bring It)". The band released its second album, ¡Viva La Cobra!, on October 23, 2007. Their third album, Hot Mess, was released on August 11, 2009. Their fourth and final album, Night Shades, was released on August 30, 2011, in the United States and October 28, 2011, in the United Kingdom.

Cobra Starship officially announced its dissolution on November 10, 2015. The band "came out of retirement" in 2024, initially performing at the When We Were Young 2024 festival in Las Vegas before announcing 2025 dates at Riot Fest in Chicago and Warped Tour festival in Long Beach.

== History ==
=== Formation and While the City Sleeps, We Rule the Streets (2005–2007) ===
Cobra Starship was formed in 2005, after Midtown bassist Gabe Saporta took a trip to Arizona. During this time, Saporta went on a "vision quest" in the desert, spending time with Native American tribes and smoking peyote. He began to create his vision for a new band, a melodic style of music heavily influenced by synthpop and hip-hop. Upon returning home, Saporta rented a house in the Catskill Mountains and began writing what would become the band's debut album, While the City Sleeps, We Rule the Streets. He posted "Hollaback Boy", a parody response to Gwen Stefani's "Hollaback Girl", on Myspace. The song gained Saporta notoriety on the internet, and he eventually signed to Decaydance Records, the label of his good friend, Fall Out Boy bassist Pete Wentz.

Midtown's management company soon set Saporta up with an opportunity to record a song for the soundtrack to the 2006 Snakes on a Plane. Along with members of The Academy Is..., Gym Class Heroes, and The Sounds, Saporta recorded "Snakes on a Plane (Bring It)", which became a minor hit. During the recording of While the City Sleeps, We Rule the Streets, Saporta began recruiting new members to complete the group's lineup. He first enlisted drummer Nate Novarro, whom he met on tour while Novarro sold merchandise for fellow touring act Hidden in Plain View. After seeing Saporta in Entertainment Weekly, guitarist Ryland Blackinton and bassist Alex Suarez emailed Saporta, asking to join the group. Elisa Jordana was recruited to join as the group's keytar player.

While the City Sleeps, We Rule the Streets was released October 10, 2006. The album peaked at number 125 on the US Billboard 200, as well as topping the US Heatseekers Albums chart. It featured the single "Snakes on a Plane (Bring It)"; the song's music video had been featured during the closing credits of the film Snakes on a Plane earlier that summer. In October 2006, they supported Thirty Seconds to Mars on their Welcome to the Universe Tour. In December 2006, Jordana was replaced by Victoria Asher. Saporta explained this decision as he had enough of Jordana bringing random people onto the tour bus and hosting dance parties while playing Britney Spears music, as well as suspecting her of stealing Suarez's iPod.

=== ¡Viva la Cobra! (2007–2008) ===
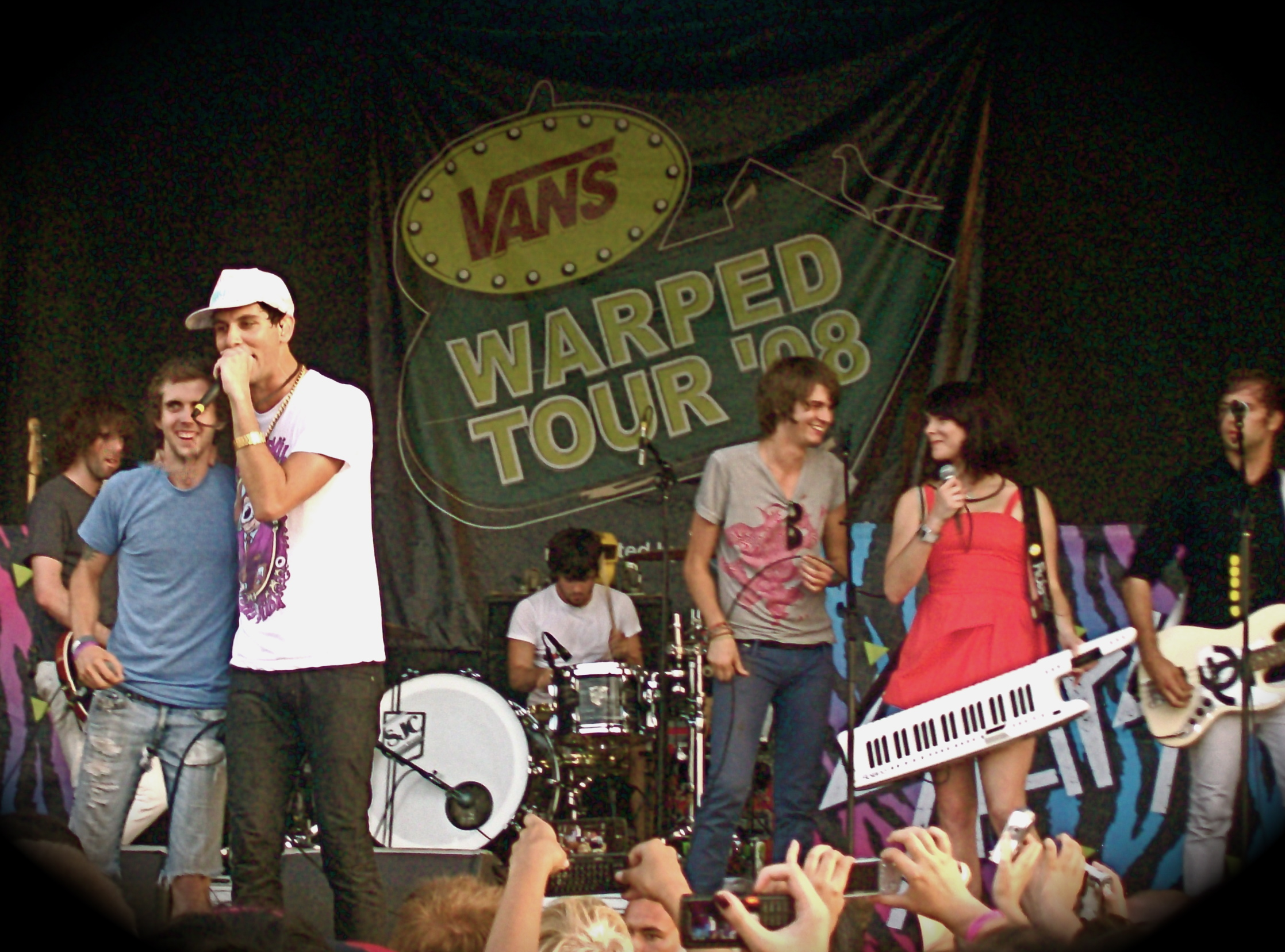
Cobra Starship performing in 2008

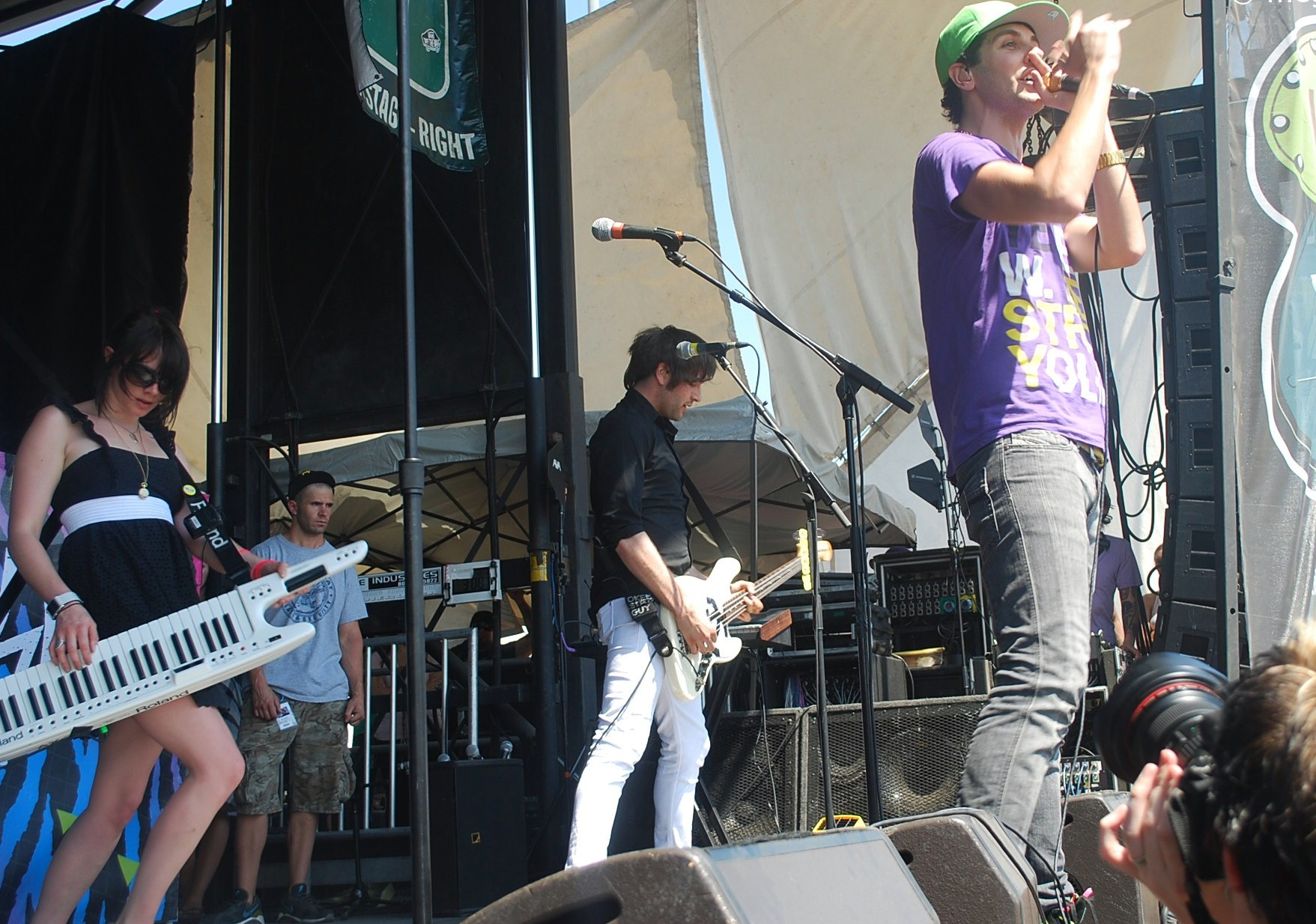
Cobra Starship performing at Warped Tour on June 20, 2008

With the group's lineup now solidified, Cobra Starship began touring across the United States. The band supported Fall Out Boy on the 2007 Honda Civic Tour along with +44 and The Academy Is... in May. While on the tour, the group began writing music together for the first time. The members recorded their individual parts on their laptops in the band's bus. By the time Cobra Starship entered the studio to work on a new album, much of the material was already written. Recorded in twenty days at Mission Sound Studios in Brooklyn, New York, ¡Viva la Cobra! was released on October 23, 2007. It was produced by Patrick Stump, who was also credited as singing some backup vocals. The album has been described as "11 tracks of unabashed party jams, full of big hooky electropop, super-produced guitar crunch and the occasional T-Pain-style vocoder thrown in for good measure." It also peaked at number 80 on the US Billboard 200. The album has sold 119,000 copies in the US. The band recorded a cover of "Three Times A Lady" by Commodores for an episode of Gilmore Girls. They also recorded the song, "Awww Dip" for the TMNT: Teenage Mutant Ninja Turtles soundtrack in the spring of 2007. A music video for "The City Is at War" was released on December 31, 2007. The song was later released as a single on May 9, 2008. The group released a music video for the single "Guilty Pleasure" and features a cameo appearance by Patrick Stump.

The group headlined the Really Really Ridiculously Good Looking Tour, with guests Metro Station, The Cab, and We The Kings, from January to March 2008. They also played on Warped Tour 2008 and headlined the SassyBack tour, which toured from October 7 through November 30, 2008, with guests Forever the Sickest Kids, Hit the Lights, and Sing It Loud. "Kiss My Sass" was released as a single on September 29, 2008, and had its music video premiered on December 5, via FNMTV.

The album art for the ¡Viva la Cobra! album was used to promote the fourth-generation Apple iPod Nano in purple.

Following the success of Katy Perry's "I Kissed a Girl", Cobra Starship recorded their own cover version, "I Kissed a Boy", in summer 2008. The song was released on August 25, 2008, on Fall Out Boy's Citizens For Our Betterment mixtape Welcome To The New Administration. Cobra Starship is one of nine artists who participated in thetruth.com's Remix Project, where they remixed the Sunny Side song "Magical Amount".

=== Hot Mess (2009–2010) ===
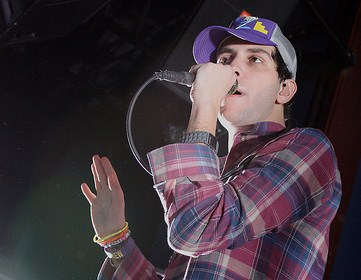
Gabe Saporta performing on November 28, 2009

Following extensive touring in 2008, the band headed to a New York City studio in September 2008, to record new songs after facing some pressure by their label to make another album. However, Saporta was diagnosed with a cyst on his vocal cords and the group did not like how the music was turning out. In 2009, the band went to a cabin in the Pocono Mountains of Pennsylvania in an attempt to produce new material. Spending two weeks in the cabin, they broadcast for four days on the live camera feed site Stickam, thus creating the Shelf Kids, an unofficial Cobra Starship fan club. Satisfied with the material, a new album was announced with a tentative release in the summer. The band worked with Kara DioGuardi, Kevin Rudolf, S*A*M and Sluggo, and songwriters Benny Blanco and Patrick Stump on Hot Mess. The album has been described as more dance punk than their previous releases. The group began the Believers Never Die Tour Part Deux tour in the beginning of April 2009, opening for Fall Out Boy, alongside All Time Low, Metro Station, and Hey Monday. They spent time performing many shows in the US, mostly all in April and the beginning of May 2009; however, they also played a few shows in the UK at the end of May 2009, supported by Sing It Loud, Cash Cash, and UK band Mimi Soya. The group recorded the song "Chew Me Up and Spit Me Out" for the 2009 Jennifer's Body soundtrack.

Gossip Girl star Leighton Meester is featured on the song "Good Girls Go Bad", which was produced by Kevin Rudolf and co-written by Rudolf and Kara DioGuardi. The song was the album's first single, and was added on iTunes on May 12, 2009, and made available to listen to on the band's official MySpace page. It is also the group's first entry on the US Billboard Hot 100, peaking at number 7. Selling two million copies in the United States, the song was certified double platinum by the Recording Industry Association of America. On May 8, the album title was confirmed as Hot Mess, with a release date of August 11. In promotion of the album, they launched a website in April, CobraCam.tv, where a new episodes premiere every Monday until the album's release. It debuted on the US Billboard 200 at number 4, becoming the band's highest-charting album and selling more than 42,000 copies in its first week. Guitarist Ryland Blackinton said of Hot Mess, "We just wanted to make music that was fun and kinda make people just forget about whatever shitty problem they might be having during the week. Since its release, the album has sold 139,000 copies in the US. The album's second single "Hot Mess" was released on October 12, 2009, and peaked at number 64 on the Billboard Hot 100.

The band began their Hot Mess Across the US Tour to promote the new album on August 3, 2009. The tour had 21 stops and featured guests such as Friday Night Boys and DJ Skeet Skeet. After Plastiscines dropped off the tour, Cobra Starship listed a number of candidate bands for the fans to vote for online in a blog; The Audition won. They performed at a September 11, 2009, MTV Video Music Awards weekend competition and pre-party at The Fillmore at Irving Plaza. The competition was for MTV's "VMA Best Breakout New York City Artist Award", and took place before the MTV Video Music Awards performers and in between performances from MTV Video Music Awards artists. At the event, their single "Good Girls Go Bad" was nominated for two awards, Best Pop Video and Best Direction. They also appeared at Los Premios MTV Latinoamérica 2009, along with Mexican star Paulina Rubio, performing "Good Girls Go Bad" and "Ni Rosas Ni Juguetes". Cobra Starship and Paulina won an MTV Latinoamérica Award for "Best Performance", for "Good Girls Go Bad" and "Ni Rosas Ni Juguetes", voted by the public, beating other artists such as Shakira, Nelly Furtado, and Wisin & Yandel. In October 2009, the group performed on Jimmy Kimmel Live. The group opened for Boys Like Girls on their headlining tour alongside The Maine, A Rocket to the Moon and VersaEmerge from October to November 2009.

At the People's Choice Awards on January 6, 2010, Cobra Starship performed "Good Girls Go Bad" live with former Pussycat Dolls frontwoman Nicole Scherzinger filling in for Leighton Meester. The group was nominated for Favorite Music Collaboration, but lost to Jay-Z, Rihanna, and Kanye West's "Run This Town." On February 4, 2010, Cobra Starship embarked on their first-ever European tour, Hot Mess Across the EU-Niverse, which included the UK, Ireland, Germany, France, and the Netherlands. When the tour ended on February 21, the band then traveled to Japan for a few shows, and then onto Australia and New Zealand for the Wet Hot Australian Summer Tour and were joined by Owl City and Amy Meredith. The group also toured in Germany with I Heart Sharks and One Night Stand!. On February 5, 2010, it was announced that Cobra Starship and 3OH!3 would be embarking on a co-headlining tour, the Too Fast for Love Tour, with opening acts Travis McCoy, The Lazarus Project, and I Fight Dragons. The tour ran from April 28 to June 13, 2010. On May 15, 2010, the group performed at the Bamboozle in Chicago.

In late 2010, the band collaborated with British singer Alexandra Burke on the song "What Happens on the Dancefloor", which was included on the deluxe edition of her debut album Overcome.

=== Night Shades (2011–2012) ===
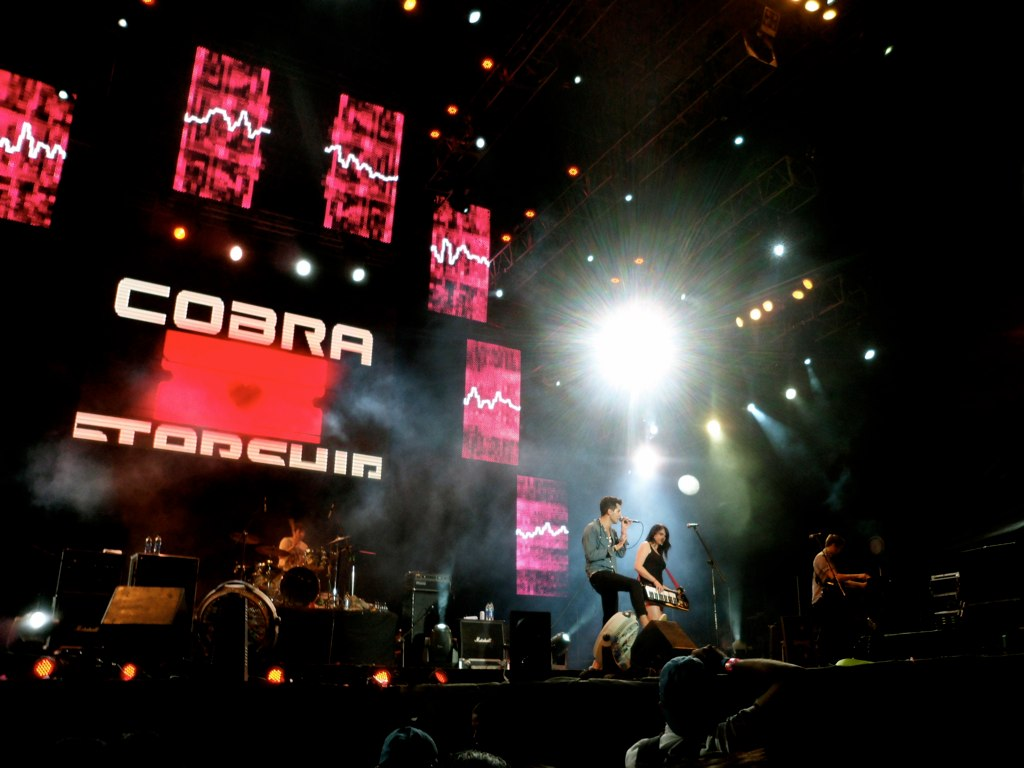
Cobra Starship performing in 2012

Cobra Starship began working on their fourth studio album in September 2010, which led to them canceling their 2011 Australian tour to finish up the album. The group worked with Ryan Tedder and Kara DioGuardi. During the initial writing sessions, Saporta wasn't happy with what they were creating. Saporta who was dealing with a breakup with his girlfriend following the success of Hot Mess, felt that the songs were "uninspired" and "really depressing." However, following a trip to South America, he felt "rejuvenated" and took inspiration from electronic duo Major Lazer for the album. On May 5, 2011, the group released "Don't Blame the World, It's the DJ's Fault" for streaming via Tumblr. Cobra Starship announced via Twitter that the new album will be called Night Shades. The first single, "You Make Me Feel...", was released on May 10, 2011. The song was written by Steve Mac and Ina Wroldsen, and features American singer/songwriter and rapper Sabi. The music video premiered on MTV on June 28, 2011. The song peaked at number 7 on the Billboard Hot 100, becoming their second Top 10 on the chart. It also debuted at number 1 in New Zealand. The song was certified triple platinum in the US by the RIAA.

On July 21, 2011, the band announced that the album would be out on August 30, 2011. Ahead of the album's release, the group released three promotional singles from Night Shades, "#1Nite (One Night)" on July 26, 2011, "Fool Like Me" (featuring the Plastiscines) on August 9, 2011, and "Middle Finger" on August 23, 2011. The group also released iTunes Session – EP on August 23, containing four acoustic songs and an alternative version of "Fold Your Hands Child". In promotion of the album, the band performed "You Make Me Feel..." on the MTV Video Music Awards pre-show with Sabi on August 28, 2011, and Night Shades was released a day early than expected on August 29. On the same day as the album's release date, they also released "Don't Blame The World, It's The DJ's Fault" for a free download via iTunes as the fourth and final promotional single. The album peaked at number 50 on the Billboard 200 and sold 9,000 copies in its first week. Cobra Starship made a handful of television appearances in the fall of 2011, performing "You Make Me Feel..." on Dancing with the Stars and The Tonight Show with Jay Leno, and "#1Nite (One Night)" on 90210.

Cobra Starship contributed a cover of Buddy Holly's "Peggy Sue" to the Buddy Holly tribute album, Listen to Me: Buddy Holly (2011). On September 9, 2011, the group headlined the Fueled by Ramen 15th Anniversary show in New York's Terminal 5, with VersaEmerge, The Academy Is..., and A Rocket to the Moon supporting. In October 2011, the group opened for Justin Bieber on the South American leg of his My World Tour. On January 3, 2012, the group released "Middle Finger" as the second single from Night Shades. The song peaked at number 14 on the US Bubbling Under Hot 100. In March 2012, Cobra Starship was featured in the Australian touring rock festival Soundwave. On May 15, 2012, "#1Nite (One Night)" was released as the third single from the album, featuring My Name Is Kay. The song reached at number 23 on the US Bubbling Under Hot 100. From June to October 2012, the group embarked on a headlining tour in the United States.

=== Cancelled fifth studio album and disbandment (2013–2015) ===
In 2013, Saporta took a break from Cobra Starship to reunite with Midtown and married his girlfriend Erin Fetherston. During that year, he found himself thinking of reviving Cobra Starship again and wanted to do things differently. On April 19, 2014, after nearly three years of no announcements of new material, Cobra Starship confirmed that they were working on a new single. The group soon announced a new single "Never Been in Love", featuring Icona Pop on August 22, 2014. It was released on August 25. Saporta had been working on the album for the past three to four months and had eight songs recorded, with hopes to put out another single and release the album in early 2015.

On October 21, 2014, both Suarez and Blackinton left the band to pursue their own separate careers. They have since been replaced by Eric Halvorsen, formerly of A Rocket to the Moon, and Andy Barr. The band played their first show with their current line-up, a Halloween party, on October 30, 2014, at Saints and Sinner. The band also played on Jimmy Kimmel Live! on November 6, 2014.

On November 10, 2015, the band released a statement on their website that they had broken up. In the post, Saporta stated, "I know that sometimes when things go on for too long, that magic can start to fade... And as hard as it is for all of us, I would rather close this chapter of our lives and be able to look back on it fondly than allow something that means so much to us stagnate." Later that month, Saporta announced on his Beats1 Radio show that he would no longer be performing or putting out new music. He and business associate Mike Carden announced the formation of a talent management firm, T∆G // The Artist Group, expected to commence operations in the first quarter of 2016. Saporta explained that he now wanted to work behind the scenes and help younger artists see their dreams come true.

From October 2016 until 2018, guitarist Andy Barr toured with rock band America, before returning to the band in 2024.

=== Reunions (2021–present) ===
In October 2021, Cobra Starship released a new song, "Beautiful Life", through Fueled By Ramen. In December 2021, they released another song, "Party With You". Both songs received accompanying videos and were previously unreleased b-sides from Hot Mess. The songs, called Tracks To The Future, were released as part of a promotional campaign for Fueled By Ramen's 25th anniversary and the limited edition re-issue of "Hot Mess" on vinyl. "Party With You" also received a Hannukah themed parody version, "Party With Jews", before its official release. 2021 promotions also included Cobrakkah, a multi-day event in the lead-up to the release of "Party With You". The group played at When We Were Young festival in October 2024 and on the second day of the festival they were joined onstage by influencer Tara Yummy who sang on "Good Girls Go Bad". On March 4, 2024, the band joined Fall Out Boy onstage and performed "Good Girls Go Bad" together. The returning line-up of the band will consist of Saporta, Novarro and Asher. Since their When We Were Young 2024 musical festival performance, they have announced selected dates to play live, including an Emo Nite performance and a scheduled 2025 Warped Tour appearance.

== Promotion and merchandise ==
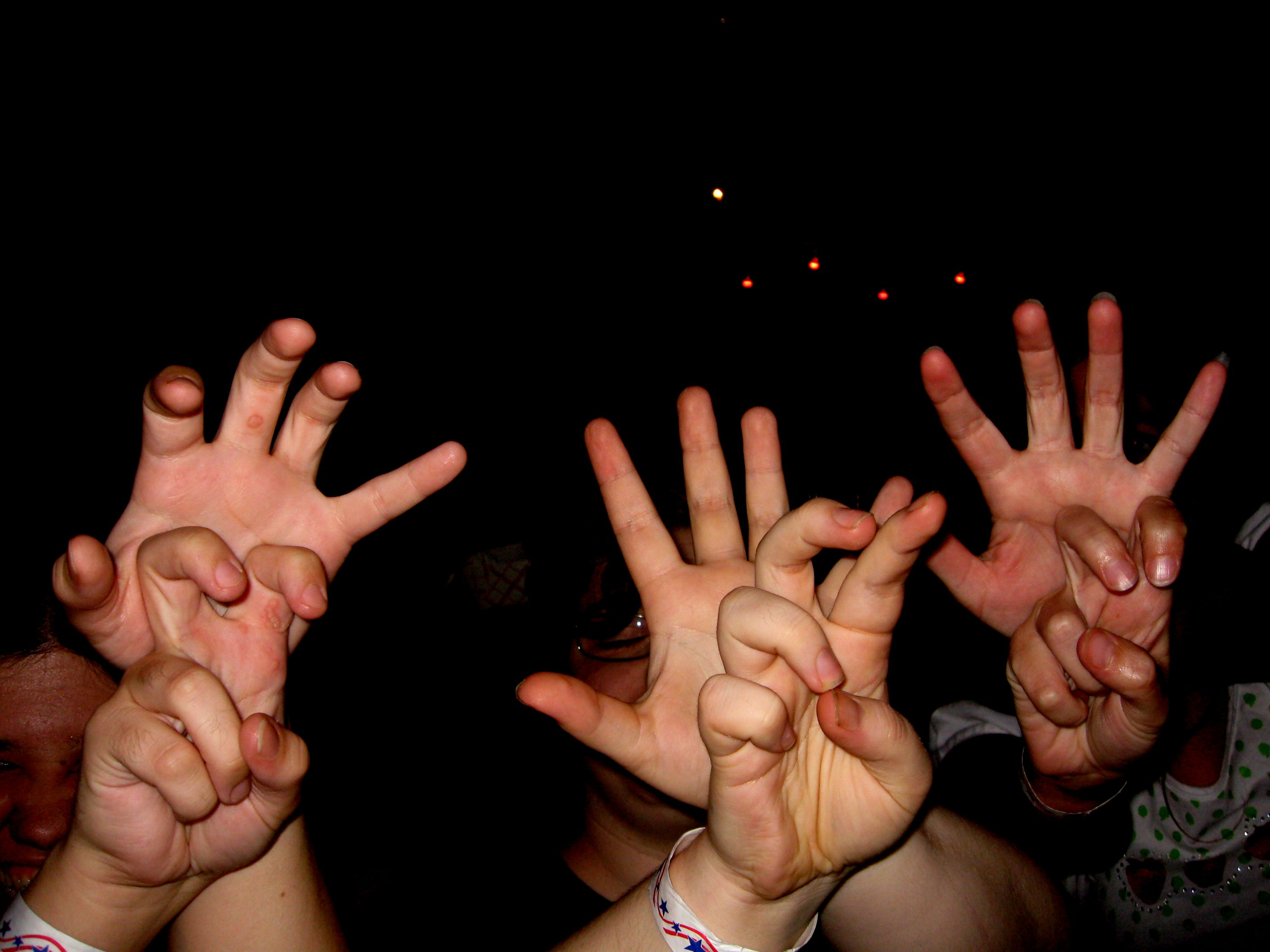
Fans doing the fangs-up symbol, 2009

Cobra Starship first started promotion as a band on their website in July 2005 but was not updated until marketing for their first album in September, While the City Sleeps, We Rule the streets. Myspace had also been actively used as a promotional social media for the band and had been more active than their website of which they would post diary entries, behind the scenes and tour dates through 2005–2013. Their music video for the Church Of Hot Addiction had appeared on the DVD music video compilation: Love Songs and Beyond in 2007 for Decaydance and Fueled By Ramen artists. Casual merchandise clothing is provided by Fueled by Ramen, which previously provided novelty items such as 'Gabe's Glasses' and Rosary's. All of their albums have been released through CDs, and special occasion LP vinyl. Their 'fangs up' symbol makes frequent appearances on clothing, pins and foam fingers.

Cobra Starship have made consistent updates to their official site with new merchandise. Exclusive merchandise has been made available at all performances since 2024 from promotion via the band's Instagram.

== Musical styles and influences ==
Cobra Starship's music is described as dance rock, electropop, pop punk, neon pop-punk, alternative rock and synthpop. Kerrang! referred to them as alternative pop, as well as a "MySpace band". The group's sound is influenced by electronic and 80s new wave music. The band cited influences from Madonna, Depeche Mode, Arthur Baker and Phoenix.

== Band members ==
Cobra Starship original line-up

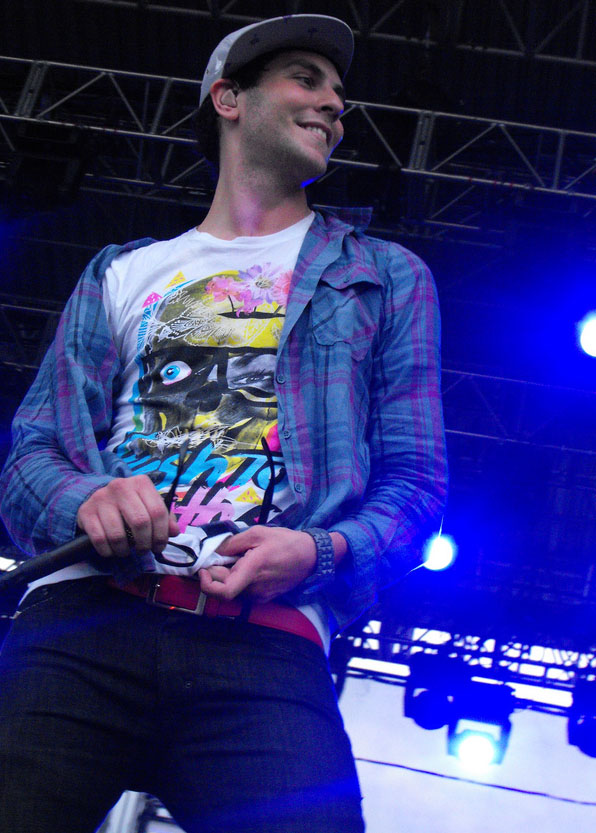
Gabe Saporta

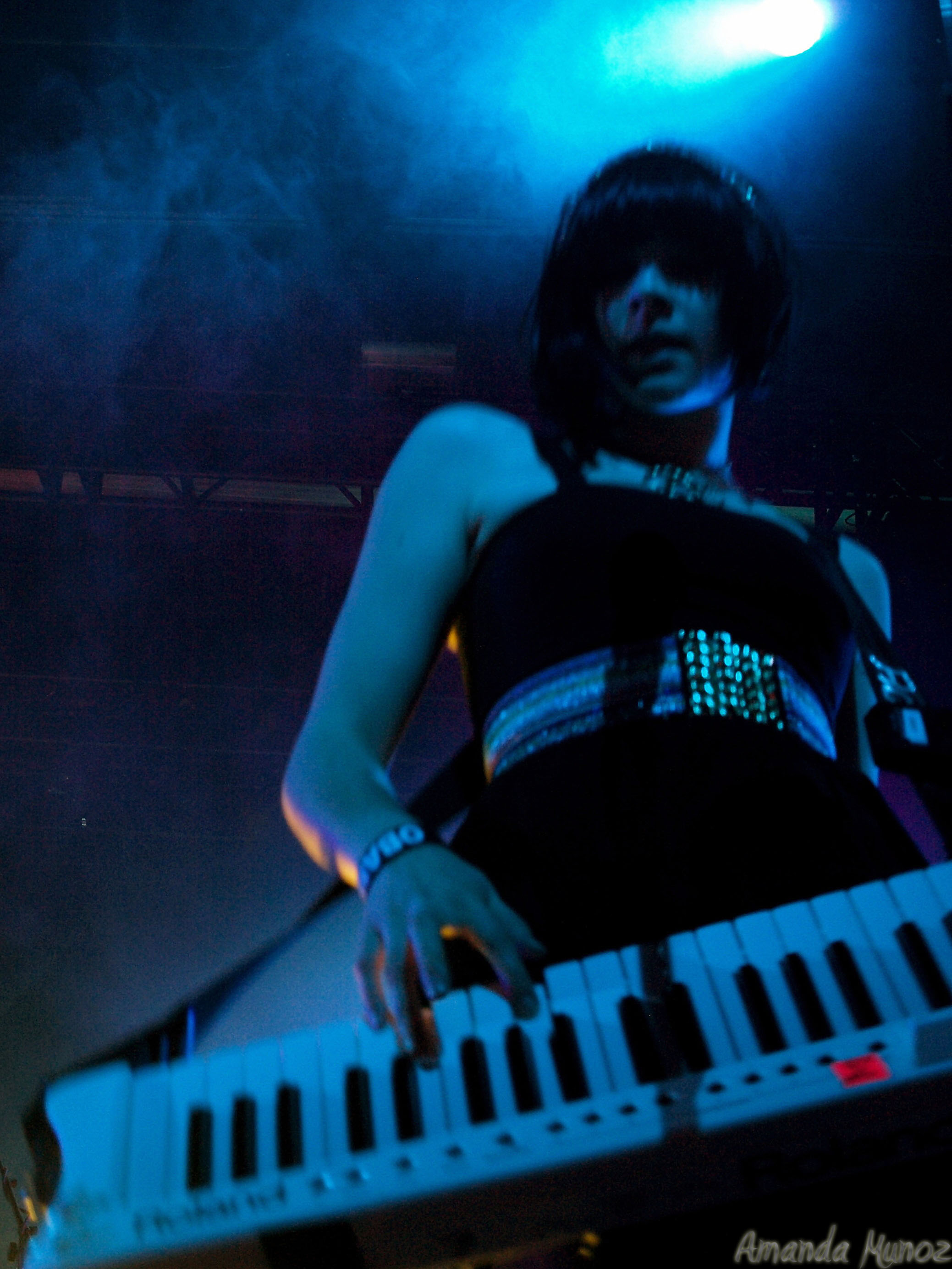
Victoria Asher

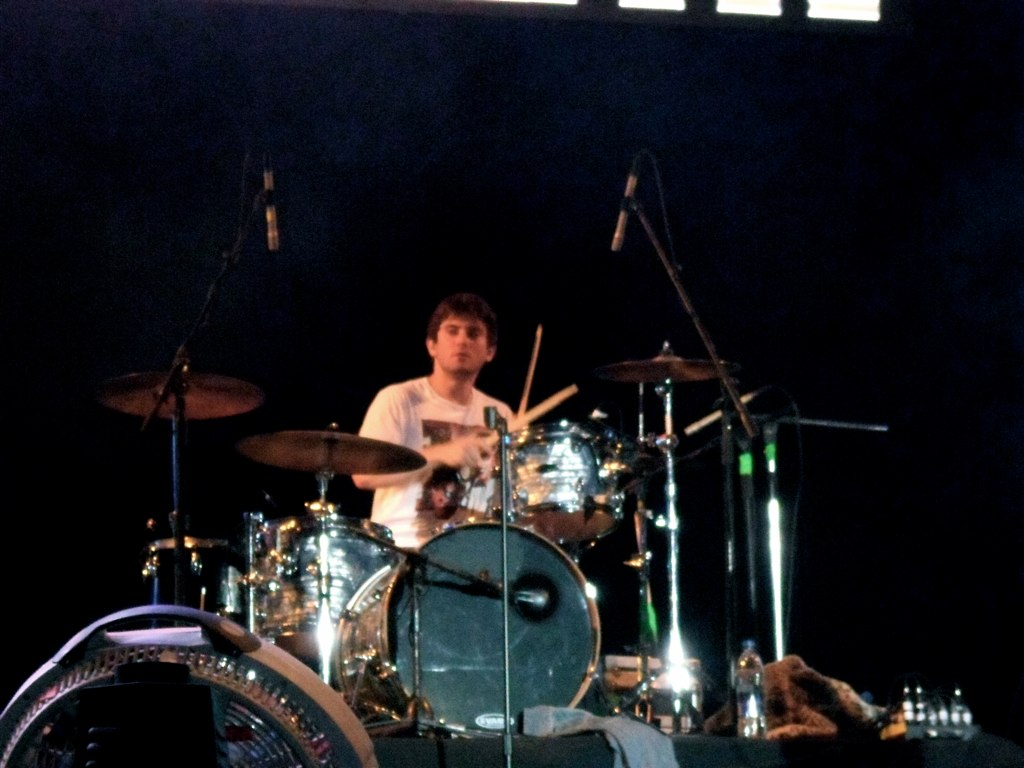
Nate Novarro

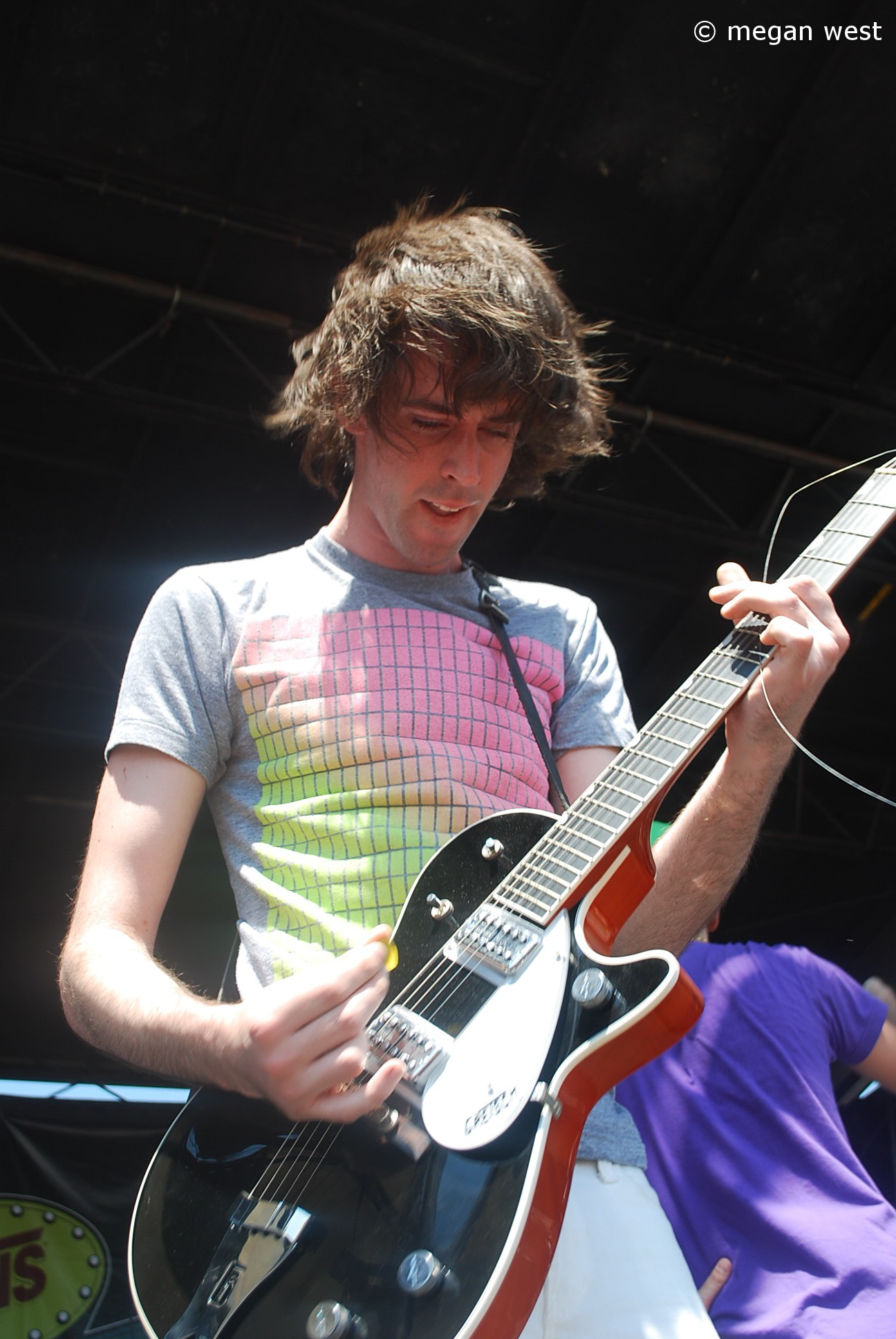
Ryland Blackinton

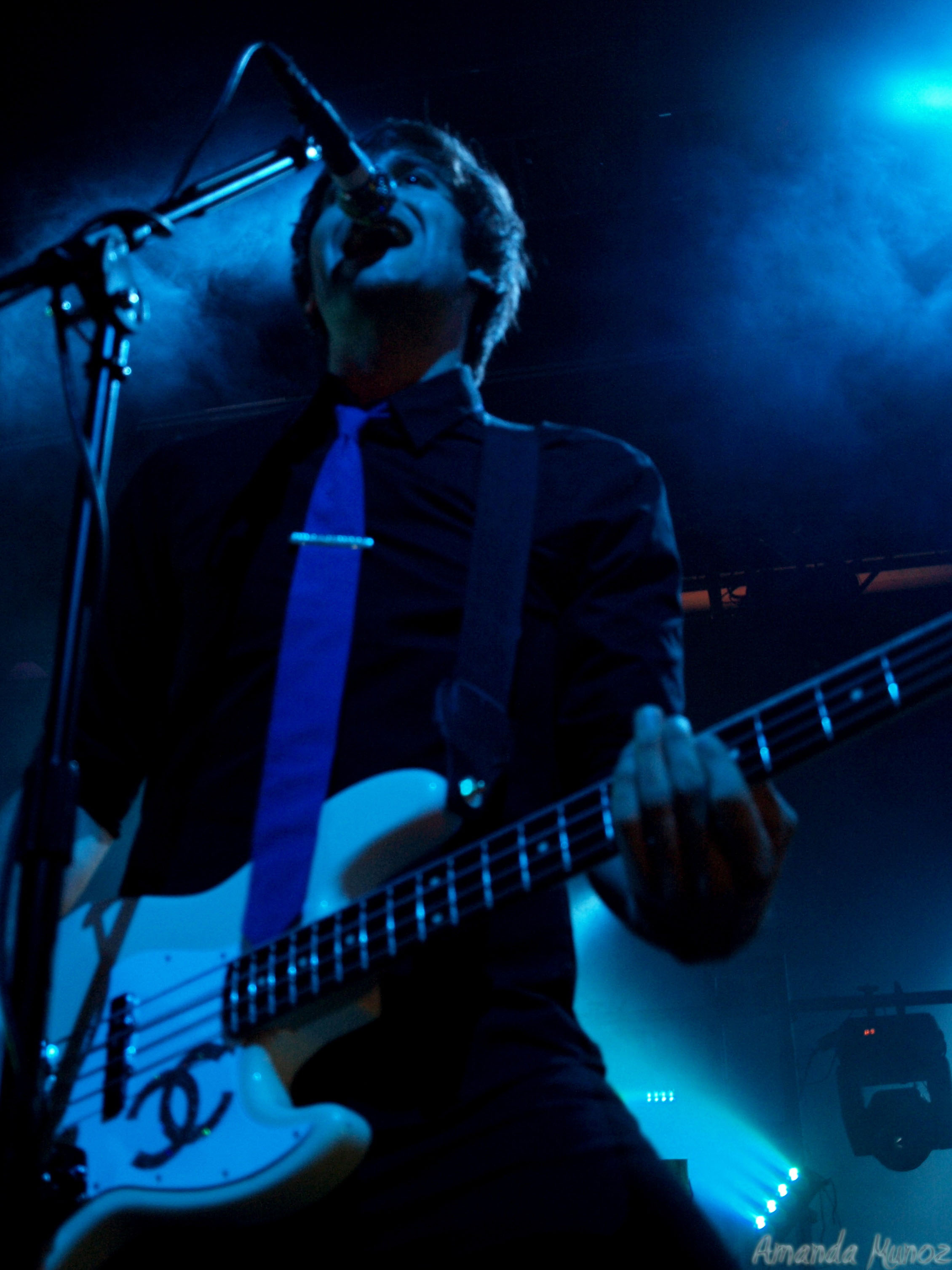
Alex Suarez

Current

- Gabe Saporta – lead vocals (2005–15, 2021, 2024–present), bass (2014)
- Nate Novarro – drums, percussion, backing vocals (2005–15, 2024–present)
- Victoria Asher – keyboards, backing vocals (2007–15, 2024–present)

Former

- Eric Halvorsen – bass, backing vocals (2014–15)
- Andy Barr – guitars, backing vocals (2014–15)
- Ryland Blackinton – guitars, backing vocals, synthesizers (2005–14)
- Alex Suarez – bass, backing vocals, synth-bass (2005–14)
- Elisa Jordana – keyboards, backing vocals (2005–07)

Timeline

== Discography ==
- While the City Sleeps, We Rule the Streets (2006)
- ¡Viva la Cobra! (2007)
- Hot Mess (2009)
- Night Shades (2011)

== Awards and nominations ==
Year	Association	Category	Nominated work	Result	Ref.
2009	MTV Video Music Awards	Best Pop Video	"Good Girls Go Bad"	Nominated	
2009	MTV Video Music Awards	Best Direction	"Good Girls Go Bad"	Nominated	
2009	Premios MTV Latinoamérica	Best Live Performance	"Good Girls Go Bad"	Won	
2010	MuchMusic Video Awards	Best International Group Video	"Good Girls Go Bad"	Nominated	
2010	People's Choice Awards	Favorite Music Collaboration	"Good Girls Go Bad"	Nominated	
2012	MuchMusic Video Awards	Best International Group Video	"You Make Me Feel..."	Nominated	
2012	MuchMusic Video Awards	Most Streamed Video of the Year	"Middle Finger"	Nominated	
