= Hot Mess (album) =

2009 album by Cobra Starship

Studio album by Cobra Starship
- Released: August 11, 2009
- Recorded: 2008–2009
- Genre: Dance-pop
- Length: 37:24 (normal edition); 56:55 (deluxe edition)
- Label: Fueled by Ramen; Decaydance
- Producer: Mike Caren; Bruno Mars

Cobra Starship chronology
¡Viva la Cobra! (2007)	Hot Mess (2009)	Night Shades (2011)

Singles from Hot Mess
- 1. "Good Girls Go Bad" Released: May 11, 2009; 2. "Hot Mess" Released: October 26, 2009

Hot Mess is the third studio album by the American musical band Cobra Starship, released through Fueled by Ramen and Decaydance Records on August 11, 2009. The album is the follow-up to 2007's ¡Viva la Cobra!. It debuted at No. 4 on the Billboard 200 albums chart on sales of more than 42,000, by far their best chart performance ever.

The first single from the album, "Good Girls Go Bad", features actress Leighton Meester and was released on May 11, 2009. The song peaked in the top ten of the Billboard Hot 100 and at number two on the New Zealand Singles Chart.

== Songwriting and recording ==
Cobra Starship toured extensively in 2008, headlining the Really Really Ridiculously Good Looking Tour during January–March, and playing the Warped Tour for two months during June–August. They were pressured by their label to make another album while on the road, and after Warped concluded they had about ten song ideas. When the label directed them to record the songs in September 2008, the band entered a New York City studio and attempted eight of the songs. Lead singer Gabe Saporta was diagnosed with a cyst on his vocal cords, but there was a much bigger problem: the band did not like the music. For instance, the song that eventually became "The Scene Is Dead; Long Live the Scene" existed only as a verse and chorus under the working title "Bright Lights", and Saporta later recalled, "I hated it. It made me cringe." Cobra Starship had been able to write the previous album, ¡Viva la Cobra!, while touring in 2007, but the band was little known at the time, and they spent their free time writing. By 2008, the band did not have enough time to themselves for composing music. The song ideas from 2008 were subpar; bassist Alex Suarez said, "We know we can do so much better."

The band shelved the recorded material while Saporta treated his vocal cords. Cobra Starship determined to hammer out better songs for the album. In January 2009, the band moved into a cabin in the Pocono Mountains of Pennsylvania for an intensive songwriting session. They spent two weeks in the cabin, four days of which were live-streamed with their fans via Stickam. Happy with the results, they returned home to New York City to collaborate with other songwriters and musicians to flesh out the songs.

Actress Leighton Meester from Gossip Girl agreed to sing on "Good Girls Go Bad", and she brought songwriter Kara DioGuardi—a judge from American Idol—to add a lyrical hook. Producers Jacob Kasher Hindlin and Kevin Rudolf assisted Saporta in writing the music, which included an interpolation of the stomping percussion of Gwen Stefani's "Hollaback Girl". Meester recorded her vocal part in Los Angeles, directed by Saporta.

The opening track, "Nice Guys Finish Last", was created as a fusion of Brian Setzer's retro big band style with Adam Ant's new wave hit "Goody Two Shoes". The backing singers, billed anonymously as the Goodie Two Shoes Gang, included Cobra Starship keyboardist Victoria Asher, wealthy Nigerian socialite Abimbola Fernandez, country/pop singer Cassadee Pope from Hey Monday, and the girlfriend of session engineer Tal Herzberg, along with more of his friends. Fernandez also modeled for the cover photo and inner sleeve artwork.

Other influences on the album include electronic rock band Ratatat throughout, and Arcade Fire's backing vocal style for the song "Fold Your Hands Child". The song "You're Not in on the Joke" uses the band's touring security guards to sing on the chorus. Britney Spears's "Womanizer" was interpolated in "Nice Guys Finish Last", which resulted in songwriters Raphael Akinyemi and Nikeshia Briscoe of the Outsyders receiving writing credit. The song "Living in the Sky With Diamonds" samples "Maneater by Hall & Oates. Cobra Starship intentionally sought out pop references to bring to this album, to create a party vibe. Guitarist Ryland Blackinton said, "We just wanted to make music that was fun and kinda make people just forget about whatever shitty problem they might be having during the week."

== Reception ==
Professional ratings
Aggregate scores
Source	Rating
Metacritic	(72/100)
Review scores
Source	Rating
AbsolutePunk.net	(39%)
Allmusic	4/5 stars
Billboard	(favorable)
MTV	(positive)
NOW	2/5 stars
People	3/4 stars
The Phoenix	3/4 stars
Rock Sound	(8/10)
Rolling Stone	3/5 stars
Spin	(7/10)

Hot Mess was met with positive reviews from music critics. On Metacritic, which assigns a rating out of 100 reviews from mainstream critics, the album gained an average score of 72. An advance review by James Montgomery of MTV stated this was their most brilliant album. Michael Menachem of Billboard fell in favor of the album, saying "If you don't finish this party record a hot mess, then you probably didn't have a good time." Tim Sendra of AllMusic called Hot Mess "a complete success and shows that the band could possibly grow past the comedy and become something else entirely." Daniel Brockman of The Phoenix gave a generally positive review, stating, "Only a music fan obsessed with the rules of authenticity and the requirements for lyrical profundity could find fault with the 11 odes to overload that make up Hot Mess." Mikael Wood of Spin raved that "Hot Mess is flush with other stupid-smart highlights, including 'Pete Wentz Is the Only Reason We're Famous." Rolling Stone's Christian Hoard said that "Sometimes the former Midtown singer's snark falls flat, as with the title 'Pete Wentz Is the Only Reason We're Famous' or the part where the singer brags about his ass. But Saporta does have some pop gifts, apparent on the disco 'Living in the Sky with Diamonds.'" Edna Gundersen of USA Today gave the album three stars out of four and stated: "While unquestionably accessible, Cobra's retro, overly flashy Swedish-leaning pop isn't for everyone. It's daft, it's dorky, it's discofied, but it's also deliciously fun and kitschy."

Bill Lamb of About.com gave the album 4/5 stars, using a comparison to praise; "You went digging around in your parents closet of old vinyl LP's from the 80's, found one with candy-coated colors on the cover, played it on their old turntable and discovered it really wasn't bad. Then a few days later after listening to it for the 15th time you realized you had fallen in love with the goofy, fun, sarcastic music. It's quite possible it sounded a lot like Cobra Starship's Hot Mess." A negative review came from Roxana Hadadi of The Washington Post who stated, "If you have the patience to sit still for the album's entirety (about 40 minutes of straight-up torture), we commend you. All those lyrics about crews, hot messes and the 'scene' — it's enough to make anyone go crazy. But if you really must take the plunge down this rabbit hole of awfulness, we'll hold your hand through it."

By October 2009, the album's sales stood at 80,000. As of June 2011, the album sold 139,000 copies in the United States.

== Track listing ==
Standard Edition
No.	Title	Length
1.	"Nice Guys Finish Last"	3:37
2.	"Pete Wentz Is the Only Reason We're Famous"	3:03
3.	"Good Girls Go Bad" (featuring Leighton Meester)	3:17
4.	"Fold Your Hands Child"	3:13
5.	"You're Not in on the Joke"	3:31
6.	"Hot Mess"	2:52
7.	"Living in the Sky With Diamonds"	3:20
8.	"Wet Hot American Summer"	3:49
9.	"The Scene Is Dead; Long Live the Scene"	2:44
10.	"Move Like You Gonna Die"	3:49
11.	"The World Will Never Do" (featuring B.o.B)	4:05

UK Version
No.	Title	Length
12.	"New Edition" (explicit version)	3:21
13.	"Good Girls Go Bad" (Frank E Remix) (featuring Flo Rida)	3:23
14.	"Good Girls Go Bad" (video)	3:17
15.	"Hot Mess" (video)	2:52

iTunes Deluxe Edition Bonus Tracks
No.	Title	Length
12.	"I May Be Rude But I'm the Truth"	3:07
13.	"New Edition"	3:20
14.	"Good Girls Go Bad" (Suave Suarez on Pleasure Ryland remix)	3:58
15.	"Good Girls Go Bad" (Matt Haick remix)	4:10
16.	"Good Girls Go Bad" (Cash Cash remix)	4:40

Amazon MP3 Exclusive Version Bonus Tracks
No.	Title	Length
12.	"Good Girls Go Bad" (MoAzza remix)	4:08

Deluxe Edition Bonus Tracks
No.	Title	Length
12.	"I May Be Rude but I'm the Truth"	3:07
13.	"Cobras Never Say Die"	3:30
14.	"Good Girls Go Bad" (Suave Suarez on Pleasure Ryland remix)	3:58
15.	"Good Girls Go Bad" (Isom Innis remix)	4:10
16.	"Good Girls Go Bad" (Cash Cash remix)	4:40

iTunes Germany
No.	Title	Length
12.	"Monkey Magic"	3:12
13.	"New Edition"	3:20
14.	"Good Girls Go Bad" (Frank E Remix) (featuring Flo Rida)	3:23

== Personnel ==
Cobra Starship

- Gabe Saporta – lead vocals
- Ryland Blackinton – guitar, backing vocals and synthesizer
- Alex Suarez – bass and backing vocals
- Nate Navarro – drums
- Victoria Asher – keytar and backing vocals

All songs written and performed by Cobra Starship

- Produced by Cobra Starship except:
  - Track 3 produced by Kevin Rudolf.
  - Tracks 6 and 7 produced by Mike Caren and Oligee and co-produced by Kevin Rudolf.
  - Tracks 10 and 11 co-produced by Jayson DeZuzio.

Additional musicians

- The Goodie Two Shoes Gang: Lori Hernberg, Cody Tompkins, Bim Fernandez, Cassadee Pope, Janice Cruz, Christine J. Schmidt, Emily Everding and Jaime Boulter – backing vocals on "Nice Guys Finish Last"
- Leighton Meester – vocals on "Good Girls Go Bad"
- Patrick Stump, Cassadee Pope, the Fuck City Singers: Pete Wentz, Matt Bro and Dre – backing vocals on "You're Not in on the Joke"
- Christine J. Schmidt – "Move Like You Gonna Die"
- B.o.B – "The World Will Never Do"

Album artwork

- Art direction and design: Mike Yardley / Skull with Hair
- Photos: Matthew Salacuse
- Live photo: Jack Edinger
- Cover girl: Bim Fernandez
- Tattoo by: James Kelly for Red Rocket Tattoo NYC
- Art manager: Kristie Borgmann
- Packaging manager: Michelle Piza
- Inspiration for title Hot Mess – L.O. 43.

== Charts ==
Chart performance for Hot Mess
Chart (2009)	Peak position
Australian Albums (ARIA)	51
Canadian Albums (Billboard)	14
Japan Top Album Sales (Billboard Japan)	96
New Zealand Albums (RMNZ)	18
UK Albums (OCC)	188
US Billboard 200	4
US Indie Store Albums Sales (Billboard)	14

== Certifications and sales ==
Certifications and sales for Hot Mess
Region	Certification	Certified units/sales
United States (RIAA)	Gold	500,000^{‡}
^{‡} Sales+streaming figures based on certification alone.
