= Listen to Me: Buddy Holly =

Compilation album by Various Artists
- Released: September 6, 2011
- Genre: Pop, rock and roll
- Length: 43:53
- Label: Verve Forecast
- Producer: Executive Producers: Peter Asher; For Songmasters: Jennifer Cohen and Regan McCarthy; All songs produced by Peter Asher except “Listen to Me” (produced by Brian Wilson), “Think It Over” (produced by Ringo Starr), and “Words of Love” (produced by Jeff Lynne).

Listen to Me: Buddy Holly is a tribute album to rock ‘n roll pioneer Buddy Holly, in celebration of what would have been his 75th birthday in 2011. The album was released by Verve Forecast in the United States on 6 September 2011 (Holly's birthday was 7 September 1936) and by eOne Entertainment on the same date in Canada. Series of international releases include releases by Victor Entertainment in Japan, Wrasse Records in the United Kingdom, Shock Records in Australia, as well as releases in Denmark, Italy, South Asia etc.

The title alludes to the Holly song "Listen to Me", which was included in the album. Some tracks were previously released, such as Linda Ronstadt's 1970s version of That'll Be the Day, which was also produced by Asher.

A similar 75th birthday tribute album, Rave On Buddy Holly, had been issued just two months previously. It contained a similar range of songs, but by a different group of artists—although Zooey Deschanel appears on both albums (as a solo artist on Listen to Me and as a member of She & Him on Rave On).

== Tribute Event/DVD ==
A tribute event held at the Music Box Theater in Hollywood on September 7, 2011 celebrated what would have been Buddy's 75th birthday. Produced by Songmasters, with Peter Asher acting as music supervisor and producer and Waddy Wachtel as music director, the event brought together the talents of Paul Anka, Michelle Branch, Cobra Starship, Shawn Colvin, Lyle Lovett, Raul Malo, Graham Nash, Stevie Nicks, Boz Scaggs, James Burton, Albert Lee, and Patrick Stump. Keith Richards, Ringo Starr, Jackson Browne, David Campbell and others who were inspired and touched by Holly’s music shared memories via video message. Buddy's widow Maria Elena Holly, seated beside Phil Everly was in attendance, singing along with every song. The event was filmed for a PBS pledge drive special featured throughout USA during December 2011.

== Track listing ==
No.	Title	Writer(s)	Artist	Length
1.	"Not Fade Away"	Buddy Holly; Norman Petty	Stevie Nicks	3:59
2.	"Maybe Baby"	Holly; Petty	Pat Monahan	2:26
3.	"Listen to Me"	Holly; Petty	Brian Wilson	2:41
4.	"I'm Lookin' for Someone to Love"	Holly; Petty	Imelda May	2:08
5.	"True Love Ways"	Holly; Petty	Jackson Browne	3:03
6.	"Peggy Sue"	Jerry Allison; Petty; Holly	Cobra Starship	2:51
7.	"Take Your Time"	Holly; Petty	The Fray	3:27
8.	"Think It Over"	Holly; Petty; Allison	Ringo Starr	1:48
9.	"Crying Waiting Hoping"	Holly	Chris Isaak	2:26
10.	"That'll Be the Day"	Allison; Holly; Petty	Linda Ronstadt	2:33
11.	"Words of Love"	Holly	Jeff Lynne	2:06
12.	"Well... All Right"	Holly; Allison; Joe B. Mauldin; Petty	Lyle Lovett	2:22
13.	"Learning the Game"	Holly	Natalie Merchant	3:28
14.	"Everyday"	Holly; Petty	Patrick Stump	2:38
15.	"It's So Easy"	Holly; Petty	Zooey Deschanel	2:55
16.	"Raining in My Heart"	Felice and Boudleaux Bryant	Eric Idle	3:01
