= Air Hollywood =

- Industry: Film
- Founded: 1998; 28 years ago in Los Angeles, United States
- Founder: Talaat Captan
- Headquarters: Los Angeles, United States
- Website: airhollywood.com

Air Hollywood is an aviation motion picture studio located in Los Angeles that has produced footage used by hundreds of films and television shows. Air Hollywood was founded in 1998 by Talaat Captan, a veteran of the film industry and aviation enthusiast. Captan was the creator of the first Mobile Airline Set, and the Pan Am Experience, a detailed recreation of a 1970s-era Pan Am airplane with full dinner service for guests. Air Hollywood also administers several public programs which use an immersive environment to encourage confidence in flying. These programs include Fearless Flight, Open Sky for Autism, and K9 Flight School.

In addition to the "Mobile Airline Set", it has a studio adapted to reproduce an executive jet, a real fuselage of a Gulfstream II and the "autoplane", which is a trailer with an airplane fuselage. The autoplane can be transported to other locations, making it easy for productions from other locations to not have to travel to Los Angeles or Atlanta.
