= Hot Mess (Cobra Starship song) =

Single by Cobra Starship

from the album Hot Mess
- Released: October 12, 2009
- Recorded: 2009
- Length: 2:52 (album version); 3:28 (video version)
- Label: Fueled by Ramen; Decaydance
- Songwriters: Gabe Saporta; Kara DioGuardi; Philip Lawrence; Peter Hernandez; Jacob Kasher Hindlin; Mike Caren; Oliver Goldstein; Ronnie Wood; Kevin Rudolf
- Producers: Cobra Starship; Caren; Oligee; Rudolf (co.)

Cobra Starship singles chronology
"Good Girls Go Bad" (2009)	"Hot Mess" (2009)	"You Make Me Feel..." (2011)

"Hot Mess" is a song recorded by the American pop punk band Cobra Starship. It was the second single released from their third studio album, Hot Mess. The song was serviced to contemporary hit radio, before it was released digitally on October 30, 2009.

== Background and composition ==
"Hot Mess" was announced as the album's second single on August 10, 2009, following the success of its lead single, "Good Girls Go Bad". The song was written by Gabe Saporta, Kara DioGuardi, Philip Lawrence, Peter "Bruno Mars" Hernandez, Jacob Kasher Hindlin, Mike Caren, Oliver Goldstein, Ronnie Wood and Kevin Rudolf. It was produced by the band, Caren, Oligee and co-produced by Rudolf.

== Music video ==
The music video for "Hot Mess" was released on November 9, 2009, via MTV and was directed by Kai Regan. It shows Saporta driving a walk-in van (with flashing lights, girls and people in sanitation clothing in the back) through New York City, working for an organization called the Cobra Crew. This organization takes people into the van, evidently to party. Saporta is then kicked out of the driver's seat and a girl starts driving the van, out-of-control at this point. The action transfers to a club, where most of the people from the van continue the party. The video ends with Saporta lying unconscious on the floor of the van, with "Hot Mess" scrawled on his chest in red make-up.

== Track listing ==
Digital download
No.	Title	Length
1.	"Hot Mess"	2:52

I'm a Hot Mess, Help Me! – The Remix EP
No.	Title	Length
1.	"Hot Mess" (DJ Cirkut Remix)	2:50
2.	"Hot Mess" (Nervo Remix Extended)	6:59
3.	"Hot Mess" (Suave Suarez on Pleasure Ryland Remix)	3:24

== Chart performance ==
"Hot Mess" debuted at number 64 on the Billboard Hot 100. It re-entered the chart at number 88 in the week ending January 9, 2010, and remained on the chart for another four weeks.

== Charts ==
Chart performance for "Hot Mess"
Chart (2009–2010)	Peak position
Canada (Canadian Hot 100)	58
Lithuania (European Hit Radio)	90
New Zealand (Recorded Music NZ)	40
UK Singles (OCC)	198
US Billboard Hot 100	64
US Pop Airplay (Billboard)	39

== Certifications ==
Certification and sales for "Hot Mess"
Region	Certification	Certified units/sales
United States (RIAA)	Gold	500,000^{*}
^{*} Sales figures based on certification alone.

== Release history ==
Release dates and formats for "Hot Mess"
Region	Date	Format	Label	Ref.
United States	October 12, 2009	Contemporary hit radio	Fueled by Ramen; Decaydance	
Various	October 30, 2009	Digital download	Fueled by Ramen; Decaydance	
