= Good Girls Go Bad =

2009 single by Cobra Starship

Single by Cobra Starship featuring Leighton Meester

from the album Hot Mess
- Released: May 12, 2009
- Recorded: 2009
- Genre: Electropop; pop punk; pop rock; dance-pop; recession pop
- Length: 3:16 (album version); 3:38 (video version)
- Label: Fueled by Ramen; Decaydance
- Songwriters: Gabe Saporta; Kara DioGuardi; Kevin Rudolf; Jacob Kasher Hindlin
- Producers: Kara DioGuardi; Kevin Rudolf

Cobra Starship singles chronology
"Kiss My Sass" (2008)	"Good Girls Go Bad" (2009)	"Hot Mess" (2009)

Leighton Meester singles chronology
"Good Girls Go Bad" (2009)	"Somebody to Love" (2009)

"Good Girls Go Bad" is a song by American pop band Cobra Starship with guest vocals by American singer and actor Leighton Meester. It was the first single released from their third studio album, Hot Mess (2009). The song was released digitally through iTunes on May 12, 2009. On May 8, 2009, Good Girls Go Bad made its radio debut on KIIS-FM with Ryan Seacrest's show.

The song was produced by former American Idol judge Kara DioGuardi and Kevin Rudolf. The song went on to become Cobra Starship and Leighton Meester's first US hit and top 10, peaking at number seven on the Billboard Hot 100 and was certified double-Platinum by the Recording Industry Association of America, denoting over 2 million copies sold in the United States. The song received heavy airplay in Canada as well, peaking at six on Canada's radio airplay chart week ending October 3, 2009. The song also debuted on Radio 1 in the UK in September 2009. The song was licensed to various media.

Some of the official remixes also feature rapper Flo Rida.

== Composition and production ==
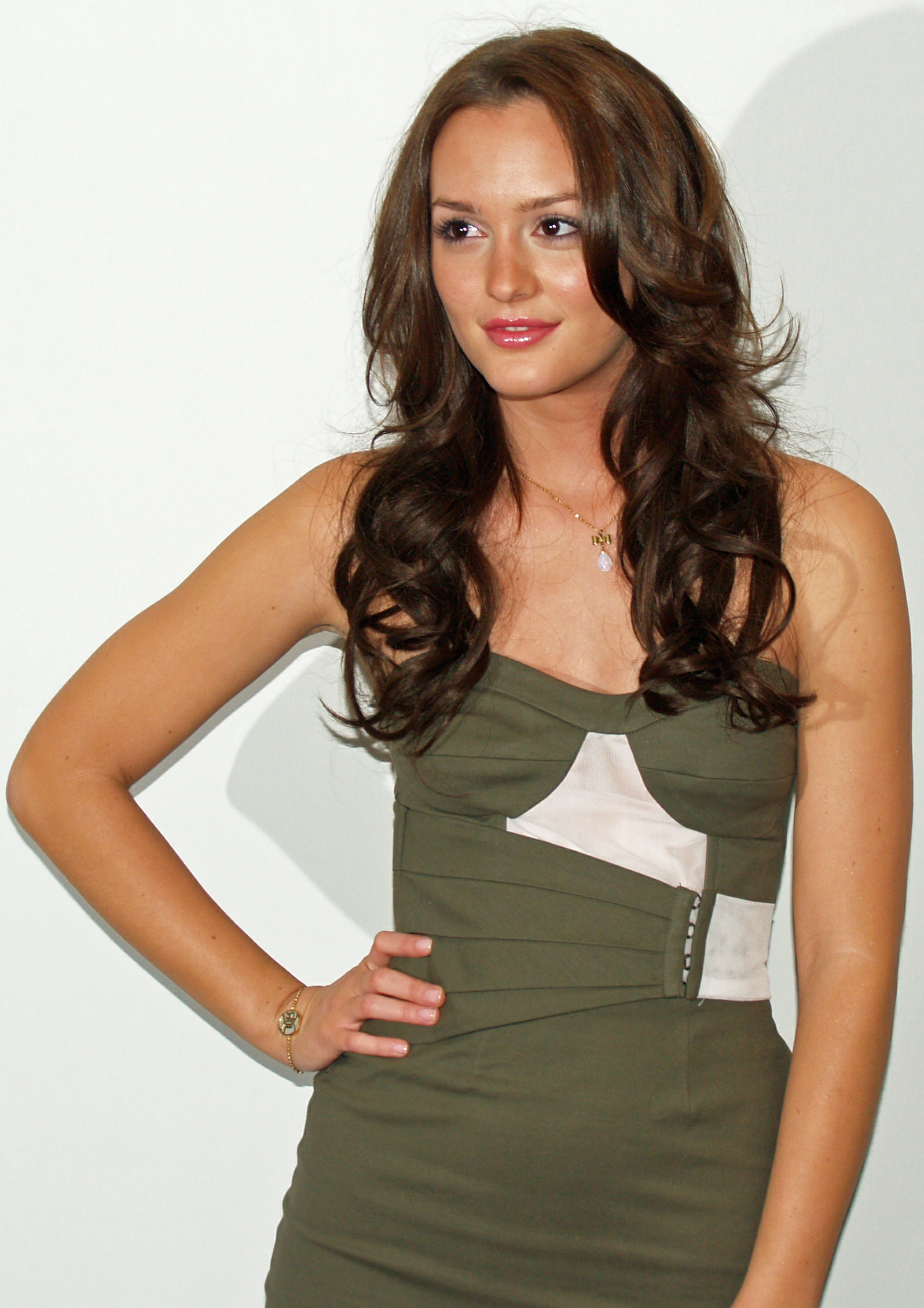
American actress and singer Leighton Meester is featured on the track.

The band was first offered to work with Kara DioGuardi in 2009, just as DioGuardi was becoming an American Idol judge. Vocalist Gabe Saporta explained,

We got offered to work with Kara right as she was becoming an American Idol judge. We didn't know who she was. She didn't know who we were. We got hooked up with her. I'm like, 'Who is this person?' She's like, 'Who's this annoying band?' But we got in the room, and it was like magic, and we wrote the song in 15 minutes. It's, like, the best song on our album.

Fifteen minutes after the creation of the hook for the song, the entire track was done. On April 27, 2009, it was announced Gossip Girl star Leighton Meester would be featured. Lead singer Gabe Saporta had wanted Meester to be featured in the song because "it's already kind of her character in Gossip Girl, like the perfect girl with the bad streak." Once Meester heard "Good Girls Go Bad", she took an immediate liking to it. "I thought, 'I need to get on that!' It totally is my sound too. Really fun to dance to it. Very edgy and cool".

"Good Girls Go Bad" is in A Minor and has a vocal range between A_{3} through C_{5}. The song moves at 126 bpm and is set in 4/4 time. The song maintains a sequence of Am–C–G–F.

== Live performances ==
Cobra Starship has performed the song live with Nicole Scherzinger at 36th People's Choice Awards, and Paulina Rubio at Los Premios MTV Latinoamérica 2009. In October 2009, the group performed the track on Jimmy Kimmel Live. On November 18, 2009, at the Flagship Store of American Eagle Outfitters, Leighton Meester gave her first-ever live performance of the song. On November 24, 2009, Leighton Meester appeared on stage with Cobra Starship at the OP Presents Tour at the Nokia Theatre, marking the first time they performed the song live together. As a surprise guest on Fall Out Boy's 2024 "So Much For 2our Dust" tour, Gabe Saporta and Vicky-T of Cobra Starship performed the song at the Anaheim show on March 4.

== Critical reception ==
Professional ratings
Review scores
Source	Rating
About.com	3.5/5 stars
Digital Spy	1/5 stars

Billboard reviewer Michael Menachem made comment on the song:

"'Good Girls Go Bad' has the magic to launch the members of Cobra Starship into superstardom. The New York dance-punk band powers the single from its third album, Hot Mess — stylish enough for a stroll along the boardwalk and rowdy enough for the club. The guy anthem is sweetened with Gossip Girl star Leighton Meester's first musical effort, adding some sass to match Gabe Saporta's energetic vocals. The contagious hook and chorus have a lively group component where the co-eds battle in a call-and-response sing-off. With a similar appeal to No Doubt's "Hey Baby" — minus the reggae but with an accelerated jolt of electro — Cobra Starship has arrived."

Bill Lamb of About.com gave the song a positive review commenting on its danceable sound and that it sounds good on the radio, catchy and sticks in the brain, and that Leighton Meester adds some spice but disregards the silly lyrics. Overall, he thinks that "This is one of the most deliberately polished pop singles of the year."

However, Mayer Nissim of Digital Spy gave the song one star out of five, saying it is "one of the most boorish, witless singles in recent memory. The music is bad enough, its sub-GaGa production bearing all the class of a street-bought 'Romex' watch. Somehow though, the lyrics manage to take the song into a whole new world of awful, reading like a passion-free imbecile manifesto." According to the review, the song is likely to be the "emotionally and artistically most bankrupt pop song" of 2009.

== Cover ==
The original cover represents Daniela Nieves stepping onto her boyfriend’s (now husband’s) chest, Benjamin Walker. In 2026, a fake AI version was made, where Walker was replaced, but this version was deleted as soon as they can.

The original cover represents Daniela Nieves stepping onto her boyfriend’s (now husband’s) chest, Benjamin Walker. In 2026, a fake AI version was made, where Walker was replaced, but this version was deleted as soon as they can.

The original cover represents Daniela Nieves stepping onto her boyfriend’s (now husband’s) chest, Benjamin Walker. In 2026, a fake AI version was made, where Walker was replaced, but this version was deleted as soon as they can.

The original cover represents Daniela Nieves stepping onto her boyfriend’s (now husband’s) chest, Benjamin Walker. In 2026, a fake AI version was made, where Walker was replaced, but this version was deleted as soon as they can.

The original cover represents Daniela Nieves stepping onto her boyfriend’s (now husband’s) chest, Benjamin Walker. In 2026, a fake AI version was made, where Walker was replaced, but this version was deleted as soon as they can.

The original cover represents Daniela Nieves stepping onto her boyfriend’s (now husband’s) chest, Benjamin Walker. In 2026, a fake AI version was made, where Walker was replaced, but this version was deleted as soon as they can.

The original cover represents Daniela Nieves stepping onto her boyfriend’s (now husband’s) chest, Benjamin Walker. In 2026, a fake AI version was made, where Walker was replaced, but this version was deleted as soon as they can.

The original cover represents Daniela Nieves stepping onto her boyfriend’s (now husband’s) chest, Benjamin Walker. In 2026, a fake AI version was made, where Walker was replaced, but this version was deleted as soon as they can.

The original cover represents Daniela Nieves stepping onto her boyfriend’s (now husband’s) chest, Benjamin Walker. In 2026, a fake AI version was made, where Walker was replaced, but this version was deleted as soon as they can.

The original cover represents Daniela Nieves stepping onto her boyfriend’s (now husband’s) chest, Benjamin Walker. In 2026, a fake AI version was made, where Walker was replaced, but this version was deleted as soon as they can.

== Chart performance ==
The song debuted on the Billboard Hot 100 chart of May 30, 2009, at number 76, becoming the first entry of both artists in the chart. On June 20, 2009, the song re-entered on chart at number 91. On August 15, 2009, the song entered the top 10 at number 10, becoming the first Top 10 of both artists in the chart. The song eventually peaked at number 7. As of August 2011, the song sold over two million copies and was certified double platinum by the RIAA in November 2020.

== Awards and nominations ==
Awards and nominations for "Good Girls Go Bad"
Year	Organization	Award	Result	Ref(s)
2009	MTV Video Music Awards	Best Pop Video	Nominated	
2009	MTV Video Music Awards	Best Direction	Nominated	
2009	Los Premios MTV Latinoamérica	Best Live Performance	Won	
2010	MuchMusic Video Awards	Best International Group Video	Nominated	
2010	People's Choice Awards	Favorite Music Collaboration	Nominated	

=== Accolades ===
Accolades for "Good Girls Go Bad"
Publication	Country	Accolade	Year	Rank	Ref.
About.com	United States	Top 100 Songs of 2009	2009	23	
idobi Radio	United States	Top 50 Songs of 2009	2009	38	

== Media usage ==
As a reference to Leighton Meester's vocals, the track was used on Gossip Girl for several scenes where her character, Blair Waldorf, is portrayed on the episode "The Freshmen." The song was also used in Greek's "Friend or Foe?" (renamed as "ZBZ Girls Go Bad"), in the season 4 premiere of Ugly Betty, and in the episode "Homecoming and Coming Home" of Hart of Dixie. It was also featured briefly on the trailer for the 2010 comedy You Again and appears in Watch Dogs and Boyhood. Its most recent usage was in the opening sequence of the season 16 Law & Order: Special Victims Unit episode "Granting Immunity" in 2015.

== Track listings ==
CD single
No.	Title	Length
1.	"Good Girls Go Bad"	3:17

Digital EP
No.	Title	Length
1.	"Good Girls Go Bad"	3:17
2.	"Good Girls Go Bad" (Suave Suarez on Pleasure Ryland remix)	3:58
3.	"Good Girls Go Bad" (Cash Cash remix)	4:39

German CD single
No.	Title	Length
1.	"Good Girls Go Bad"	3:17
2.	"Good Girls Go Bad" (featuring Flo Rida and DJ Frank E)	3:22

German CD maxi
No.	Title	Length
1.	"Good Girls Go Bad"	3:17
2.	"Good Girls Go Bad" (Frank E remix featuring Flo Rida)	3:22
3.	"Good Girls Go Bad" (MoAzza remix)	4:08
4.	"Good Girls Go Bad" (Funk Generation Club remix)	6:54
5.	"Good Girls Go Bad" (Suave Suarez on Pleasure Ryland remix)	3:58
6.	"Good Girls Go Bad" (music video)	3:39

== Charts ==
=== Weekly charts ===
Weekly chart performance for "Good Girls Go Bad"
Chart (2009–2010)	Peak position
Australia (ARIA)	5
Austria (Ö3 Austria Top 40)	37
Belgium (Ultratip Bubbling Under Flanders)	4
Canada Hot 100 (Billboard)	7
CIS Airplay (TopHit)	82
Finland (Suomen virallinen lista)	13
Ireland (IRMA)	17
Japan (Japan Hot 100)	47
Latvia (European Hit Radio)	7
Mexico Ingles Airplay (Billboard)	44
Netherlands (Dutch Top 40)	19
Netherlands (Single Top 100)	61
New Zealand (Recorded Music NZ)	2
Russia Airplay (Tophit)	89
Scottish Singles Sales (Official Charts)	11
Slovakia (Rádio Top 100)	24
UK Singles (Official Charts)	17
UK Dance (Official Charts)	8
US Billboard Hot 100	7
US Adult Pop Airplay (Billboard)	25
US Dance Airplay (Billboard)	24
US Pop Airplay (Billboard)	5
US Rhythmic Airplay (Billboard)	32

=== Year-end charts ===
Year-end chart performance for "Good Girls Go Bad"
Chart (2009)	Position
Australia (ARIA)	25
Canadian Hot 100 (Billboard)	44
Latvia (European Hit Radio)	85
Netherlands (Dutch Top 40)	127
New Zealand (RIANZ)	18
UK Singles (OCC)	155
US Billboard Hot 100	43
US Pop Songs (Billboard)	32

== Certifications ==
Certifications and sales for "Good Girls Go Bad"
Region	Certification	Certified units/sales
Australia (ARIA)	Platinum	70,000^{^}
Canada (Music Canada)	Platinum	80,000^{*}
New Zealand (RMNZ)	Platinum	15,000^{*}
United Kingdom (BPI)	Silver	200,000^{‡}
United States (RIAA)	2× Platinum	2,000,000
^{*} Sales figures based on certification alone.^{^} Shipments figures based on certification alone.^{‡} Sales+streaming figures based on certification alone.

== Release history ==
Release dates for "Good Girls Go Bad"
Region	Date	Format	Label	Ref.
United States	May 12, 2009	Digital download	Fueled by Ramen; Decaydance	
Canada	May 12, 2009	Digital download	Fueled by Ramen; Decaydance	
United Kingdom	October 19, 2009	CD single; digital download	Fueled by Ramen; Decaydance	
Austria	January 22, 2010	CD maxi; CD single	Fueled by Ramen; Decaydance	
Germany	January 22, 2010	CD maxi; CD single	Fueled by Ramen; Decaydance	
