= While the City Sleeps, We Rule the Streets =

Studio album by Cobra Starship
- Released: October 10, 2006
- Studio: The Ballroom Studio, Los Angeles, California
- Genre: Pop-punk; dance-pop; dance-rock; electropop
- Length: 37:13
- Label: Fueled by Ramen; Decaydance
- Producer: S*A*M & Sluggo; Gabe Saporta

Cobra Starship chronology
While the City Sleeps, We Rule the Streets (2006)	¡Viva la Cobra! (2007)

Singles from While the City Sleeps, We Rule the Streets
- 1. "Snakes on a Plane (Bring It)" Released: August 28, 2006; 2. "The Church of Hot Addiction" Released: March 12, 2007; 3. "Send My Love to the Dancefloor, I'll See You in Hell (Hey Mister DJ)" Released: August 20, 2007

While the City Sleeps, We Rule the Streets is the debut studio album by American dance-rock band Cobra Starship. It was released on October 10, 2006 in the US, and on October 17, 2006 in Canada. A rough clip of "Send My Love to the Dancefloor, I'll See You In Hell (Hey Mister DJ)", a finished version of "Snakes on a Plane (Bring It)", and "The Church of Hot Addiction" were uploaded onto Cobra Starship's PureVolume site. "The Church of Hot Addiction" was also used as the theme song for the WWE's Great American Bash 2007. It has sold more than 69,000 copies to date.

== Background ==
Cobra Starship was formed in 2005 after Midtown bassist Gabe Saporta took a trip to the deserts of Arizona. During this time, Saporta went on a "vision quest", spending time with Native American tribes and smoking peyote. He began to create his vision for a new band, a melodic style of music heavily influenced by synthpop and hip hop. Upon returning home, Saporta rented a house in the Catskill Mountains and began writing what would become While the City Sleeps, We Rule the Streets. He posted a parody response to Gwen Stefani's "Hollaback Girl" titled "Hollaback Boy" on Myspace. The song gained Saporta notoriety on the internet and he eventually signed to Fall Out Boy bassist Pete Wentz's label, Decaydance Records.

Gabe Saporta stated that most of the songs from this recording particularly concern his personal life and career: "Being from Jersey Means Never Having to Say You're Sorry" centers on feelings of emptiness and hopelessness, regarding the area he was (partly) brought-up in, while "The Ballad of Big Poppa and Diamond Girl" concerns a quiet young girl he met at a disco in Los Angeles.

== Composition ==
On While the City Sleeps, We Rule the Streets Saporta abandons the "voice-quivering drama and super-intense rock" of Midtown in favor of "a more lighthearted, groove-oriented style". The album begins with an acoustic intro entitled "Being from Jersey Means Never Having to Say You're Sorry". The opening of "Send My Love to the Dancefloor, I'll See You in Hell (Hey Mister DJ)" has been compared to U2, while the Glenn Gamboa of the Chicago Tribune likened the song's chorus to Madonna's "Music". The song features "'70s synth whistles and an '80s new wave bass line". The tracks "Keep It Simple" and "It's Amateur Night at the Appollo Creed" are described as hip-rock, featuring electronic beats.

== Critical reception ==
Professional ratings
Review scores
Source	Rating
AbsolutePunk	(76%)
AllMusic	4/5 stars
Alternative Press	4/5 stars
The Digital Fix	(6/10)
IGN	(6.8/10)
Punknews.org	2/5 stars
Rolling Stone	2/5 stars
Spin	(5/10)

While the City Sleeps, We Rule the Streets was met with positive reviews from music critics. Tony Pascarella of AbsolutePunk stated the album, "should please many longtime Midtown fans, partly because many of the songs are not bubbly dance numbers. Gabe has decided to pursue the Cobra Starship tangent to his career to the fullest, even at the expense of big-money success. He reportedly turned down a six-figure advance from a major label to sign with Pete Wentz's Fueled By Ramen imprint, illustrating Saporta's dedication to his music and this release. This could certainly be a better-stacked album from start to finish, but as long as he's having fun with Cobra Starship, who can truly fault him?" Corey Apar of AllMusic remarked, While the City Sleeps, We Rule the Streets embodies both the giddy highs and winding-down lows that come from a carefree night out on the town with friends. It's nothing more and nothing less. But that's just fine—that's really all it wants to be anyway." Ed Thompson of IGN noted how the band took "a very Panic! at the Disco-esque approach" and described the album as "entertaining" and "worth a listen."

Kevin O'Donnell of Rolling Stone gave a negative for the album stating, "Following in the tracks of Panic! at the Disco and Fall Out Boy, Cobra put out high-energy, techno-fied emo songs with exhausting song titles such as 'Send My Love to the Dance Floor I'll See You in Hell (Hey Mister DJ)'. But without Fall Out Boy's innocent charm or Panic!'s cabaret theatricality, Cobra Starship just seem like some punks crashing a make-out party. On the creepy 'It's Warmer in the Basement', frontman Gabe Saporta comes across as a perv when he intones in a nasally voice... And on the vaguely funky 'Keep It Simple', he promises to make a girl's dreams come true." Trevor Kelley of Spin gave a mixed review remarking, "Gabe Saporta wanders rather smugly through this knowing collection of dance-punk workouts and plaintive electro-pop ballads. 'Snakes' is here, but the only other song that's as fun or dumb is 'Pop-Punk is Sooooo '05', a giddy mall sing-along."

== Track listing ==
All tracks are written by Gabe Saporta, Dave Katz and Sam Hollander, except where noted.

No.	Title	Writer(s)	Length
1.	"Being from Jersey Means Never Having to Say You're Sorry"		2:05
2.	"Send My Love to the Dance Floor I'll See You in Hell (Hey Mister DJ)"		3:48
3.	"The Church of Hot Addiction"		3:40
4.	"The Kids Are All Fucked Up"		4:15
5.	"It's Warmer in the Basement"		2:57
6.	"Keep It Simple"	Gabe Saporta, Ted Leo	4:10
7.	"It's Amateur Night at the Apollo Creed!"		3:08
8.	"Bring It (Snakes on a Plane)"	Saporta, William Beckett, Travis McCoy, Maja Ivarsson	3:14
9.	"The Ballad of Big Poppa and Diamond Girl"	Saporta	3:27
10.	"Pop-Punk Is Sooooo '05"		3:01
11.	"You Can't Be Missed If You Never Go Away"		3:21

== Charts ==
Chart performance for While the City Sleeps, We Rule the Streets
Chart (2006)	Peak position
US Billboard 200	125
US Heatseekers Albums (Billboard)	1
US Independent Albums (Billboard)	7
