= Snakes on a Plane =

2006 film by David R. Ellis

- Theatrical release poster
- Directed by: David R. Ellis
- Screenplay by: John Heffernan; Sebastian Gutierrez
- Story by: David Dalessandro; John Heffernan
- Produced by: Craig Berenson; Don Granger; Gary Levinsohn
- Starring: Samuel L. Jackson; Julianna Margulies; Nathan Phillips; Bobby Cannavale; Flex Alexander; Todd Louiso; Sunny Mabrey; Kenan Thompson; Elsa Pataky; David Koechner
- Cinematography: Adam Greenberg
- Edited by: Howard E. Smith
- Music by: Trevor Rabin
- Production company: Mutual Film Company
- Distributed by: New Line Cinema
- Release dates: August 17, 2006 (Puerto Rico); August 18, 2006 (United States)
- Running time: 106 minutes
- Country: United States
- Language: English
- Budget: $33 million
- Box office: $62 million

Snakes on a Plane is a 2006 American action thriller film directed by David R. Ellis and starring Samuel L. Jackson. It was released by New Line Cinema on August 18, 2006, in North America and the UK. The film was written by David Dalessandro, John Heffernan, and Sebastian Gutierrez and follows the events of dozens of venomous snakes being released on a Boeing 747-400 in an attempt to kill a trial witness.

The film gained a considerable amount of attention before its release, forming large fanbases online and becoming an Internet phenomenon, due to the film's title, casting, and premise. In response to the Internet fan base, New Line Cinema incorporated feedback from online users into its production, and added five days of reshooting. Before and after the film was released, it was parodied and alluded to on television shows and films, fan-made videos, video games, and various forms of literature.

The film received mixed reviews and was a "box office disappointment". Despite the immense Internet buzz, the film's gross revenue did not live up to expectations; it earned US$15.25 million in its opening weekend. The film grossed US$62 million worldwide before its release on home video on January 2, 2007.

== Plot ==
After witnessing crime lord Eddie Kim brutally murder prosecutor Daniel Hayes in a secluded forest in Hawaii, Sean Jones, after being rescued from Kim's henchmen by FBI agent Neville Flynn, is escorted by Flynn and fellow agent John Sanders on a Boeing 747-400 to testify in a trial against Kim in Los Angeles. Kim arranges for a time-release crate full of venomous snakes to be placed in the cargo hold in an attempt to bring down the plane before it reaches Los Angeles International Airport (LAX). To ensure the snakes indiscriminately attack everybody without the need for provocation, he has a henchman disguised as an airport ground employee spray the passengers' leis with a special pheromone which makes the snakes highly aggressive.

The crate opens midway through the flight and the snakes make their way through the cabin, with a viper attacking an electric panel in the process, thus shutting down the power. A cat in the cargo bay, a couple having sex in a bathroom, and a man using another bathroom are the first ones to be killed. The plane's captain, Sam McKeon, investigates the power outage and fixes an electrical short, but is killed by the viper that caused it. Co-pilot Rick, unaware of the snakes, believes Sam has suffered a heart attack and continues toward LAX. Some snakes attack Rick, and while fending them off, he accidentally releases the oxygen masks throughout the plane, causing most of the snakes to drop into the cabin with them. Numerous passengers, including Agent Sanders, are killed when the snakes invade the cabin.

The surviving passengers, who have made their way to the front of the plane, put up blockades of luggage in a desperate attempt to stop the snakes. Rick is attacked and the plane starts to descend, causing a food trolley to crash through the luggage blockade. The passengers flee to the upstairs first-class cabin before blocking the stairwell with an inflatable life raft. Flynn and flight attendant Claire regain control of the plane while Rick retakes the controls and has Flynn go into the cargo hold to restore the air-conditioning/ventilation system. Flynn contacts FBI special agent Hank Harris on the ground, who gets in touch with ophiologist Dr. Steven Price, Customs' main source for animal-smuggling cases.

Based on pictures of the reptiles emailed to him via Mercedes's mobile phone, Price believes that Kraitler Mullet, a snake dealer based in Los Angeles' outskirts known for illegally importing exotic and highly dangerous snakes, is responsible. After a shootout, the agents subject Kraitler to tactical interrogation after the latter is injured by a snakebite; with Harris withholding the antivenom, the injured Kraitler finally reveals that Kim hired him to obtain the snakes and exposes more of Kim's schemes of smuggling them on board the flight. Price medicates Kraitler and commandeers his supplies of antivenom for the plane victims, based on the list Kraitler gives him, while Harris orders Kim arrested and tried on multiple counts of murder and attempted murder, with the death penalty as an option.

Harris contacts Flynn, telling him that antivenom will be ready for the passengers when they land. However, Flynn discovers that the cockpit is filled with snakes and Rick is dead. After a brief discussion, Troy, a bodyguard for rapper Three G's, agrees to land the plane based on his experience playing a flight simulator. After everyone gets prepared, Flynn shoots out two windows with his pistol, causing the plane to depressurize. The snakes are blown out of the cockpit and the lower floor of the plane. Despite his lack of real-world experience, Troy makes an emergency landing and the plane makes it to the terminal. The passengers exit the plane and antivenom is given to those who need it.

Just as Flynn and Sean are about to disembark, a remaining snake jumps out and bites Sean in the chest. Flynn draws his gun and shoots the snake, and paramedics rush to a traumatized Sean, who remains unharmed due to a ballistic vest he wore throughout the ordeal. Neville connects with Claire, as does Sean with Tiffany. As a token of gratitude, Sean later takes Flynn to Bali and teaches him how to surf.

== Cast ==
- Samuel L. Jackson as Agent Neville Flynn, an FBI agent assigned to protect Sean Jones on his flight to Los Angeles.
- Julianna Margulies as Claire Miller, a flight attendant whom Flynn befriends.
- Nathan Phillips as Sean Jones, a surfer and dirtbike racer who witnesses a brutal murder committed by Eddie Kim.
- Bobby Cannavale as Special Agent Henry "Hank" Harris, Flynn's colleague.
- Flex Alexander as Clarence "Three G's" Dewey, a germophobic famous rapper and actor.
- Todd Louiso as Dr. Steven Price, a snake venom expert assigned by the FBI to communicate with Flynn.
- Sunny Mabrey as Tiffany Engelhard, a young flight attendant who develops a crush on Sean.
- Kenan Thompson as Troy, Clarence's childhood friend and bodyguard.
- Rachel Blanchard as Mercedes Harbont, a socialite passenger who brings her pet Chihuahua Mary-Kate aboard.
- Lin Shaye as Grace, a middle-aged flight attendant who acts as the flight's purser.
- David Koechner as Richard "Rick" Archibald, Captain McKeon's co-pilot.
- Elsa Pataky as Maria, a passenger traveling with her infant daughter Isabella.
- Keith Dallas as Big Leroy, Clarence's childhood friend and bodyguard.
- Bruce James as Ken, an eccentric flight attendant.
- Terry Chen as Chen Leong, a professional kickboxer and a passenger.
- Mark Houghton as Agent John Sanders, Flynn's colleague assigned to protect Sean Jones.
- Tom Butler as Captain Samuel "Sam" McKeon, the captain of the plane.
- Kevin McNulty as Emmett Bradley, an air traffic tower controller.
- Samantha McLeod as Kelly, a young woman who boards the plane with her boyfriend.
- Taylor Kitsch as Kyle, a young man who boards the plane with his girlfriend.
- Byron Lawson as Eddie Kim, a crime syndicate leader.
- Gerard Plunkett as Paul Oswald, an arrogant British businessman and passenger

== Production ==
The story is credited to David Dalessandro, a University of Pittsburgh administrator and first-time Hollywood writer. He developed the concept in 1992 after reading a nature magazine article about Indonesian brown tree snakes climbing onto planes in cargo during World War II. He originally wrote the screenplay about the brown tree snake loose on a plane, titling the film Venom. He soon revised it, expanding upon the premise to include a plague of assorted venomous snakes, then—crediting the film Aliens—revised it once again to include "lots of them loose in the fuselage of a plane." Dalessandro's third draft of Venom was turned down by more than 30 Hollywood studios in 1995. In 1999, a producer for MTV/Paramount showed interest in the script, followed up by New Line Cinema, which took over the rights for production.

Originally, the film, under the working title Snakes on a Plane, was going to be directed by Hong Kong action director Ronny Yu. Jackson, who had previously worked with Yu on The 51st State, learned about the announced project in the Hollywood trade newspapers and, after talking to Yu, agreed to sign on without reading the script, based on the director, storyline, and the title. Initially New Line Cinema did not believe that Jackson had actually signed on to the project and had to call his agent to clarify. Jackson would later defend his choice of starring in the movie by stating "it was the kind of movie I would have gone to see when I was a kid", further clarifying "I feel sorry for all those people that are going through that whole trip of 'Why would Samuel Jackson do something like this?' and 'It's lowbrow.' It's a movie. People go to movies on Saturday to get away from the war in Iraq and taxes and election news and pedophiles online and just go and have some fun and I like doing movies that are fun." Yu departed the project only a few months later. New Line Cinema went with David Ellis, who had directed Final Destination 2 for them and had also served as a second-unit director on prior Jackson movies with Sphere and Deep Blue Sea.

The film's B movie-esque title generated a lot of pre-release interest on the Internet. One journalist wrote that Snakes on a Plane is "perhaps the most internet-hyped film of all time". Much of the initial publicity came from a blog entry made by screenwriter Josh Friedman, who had been offered a chance to work on the script. The casting of Jackson further increased anticipation. At one point, the film was given the title Pacific Air Flight 121, only to have it changed back to the working title at Jackson's request. In August 2005, Jackson told an interviewer, "We're totally changing that back. That's the only reason I took the job: I read the title." On March 2, 2006, the studio reverted the title to Snakes on a Plane. New Line hired two additional writers to smooth out the screenplay.

Taking advantage of the Internet buzz for what had been a minor film in their 2006 line-up, New Line Cinema ordered five days of additional shooting in early March 2006 (principal photography had wrapped in September 2005). While re-shoots normally imply problems with a film, the producers opted to add new scenes to the film to change the MPAA rating from PG-13 to R and bring it in line with growing fan expectations. The most notable addition was a revision of a catchphrase from the film that was parodied on the Internet by fans of the film, capitalizing on Jackson's typically foul-mouthed and violent film persona: "Enough is enough! I have had it with these motherfucking snakes on this motherfucking plane!". Subsequently, the public responded favorably to this creative change and marketing strategy, leading some members of the press to speculate that "the movie has grown from something of a joke into a phenomenon". The Daily Telegraph described this process as making the film "crowdsourced" and The Guardian described it as "the first Wikipedia-ised movie, created by the users themselves". Jackson told GQ in 2024, "They were trying to make a PG-13 movie, and you can only have one 'fuck' or some shit like that in it. And I told them, 'Look, I gotta say motherfucker in this movie. There's motherfucking snakes all over this plane.'"

More than 450 snakes were used for filming to represent 30 different species of snakes. The different species include a 19-foot (5.8 m) Burmese python named Kitty (which the crew called Kong for film purposes), scarlet kingsnake (the non-venomous double for the eastern coral snake), milk snake, corn snakes, rattlesnakes, and mangrove snakes. The scarlet kingsnake and Pueblan milk snake stood in for coral snakes, while the Eastern milk snake and Florida kingsnake filled the role of the venomous Australian taipan (which attacks the couple having sex and the man using a restroom respectively). About two-thirds of the snakes seen throughout the film were either animatronic or CGI. The snakes that were real were mostly the non-venomous ones that are never seen attacking anyone. The scenes where someone is clearly bitten were often done with a mix of animatronic and animation. According to the DVD, all the snakes had production names, but only Scarface (an animated pit viper), Peanut (a cobra), and Kong are mentioned by name in the audio commentary. During filming, Jackson did not interact with any live snakes, due to a contract clause preventing snakes from being within 8 m (25 ft) of the actor.

== Media coverage ==
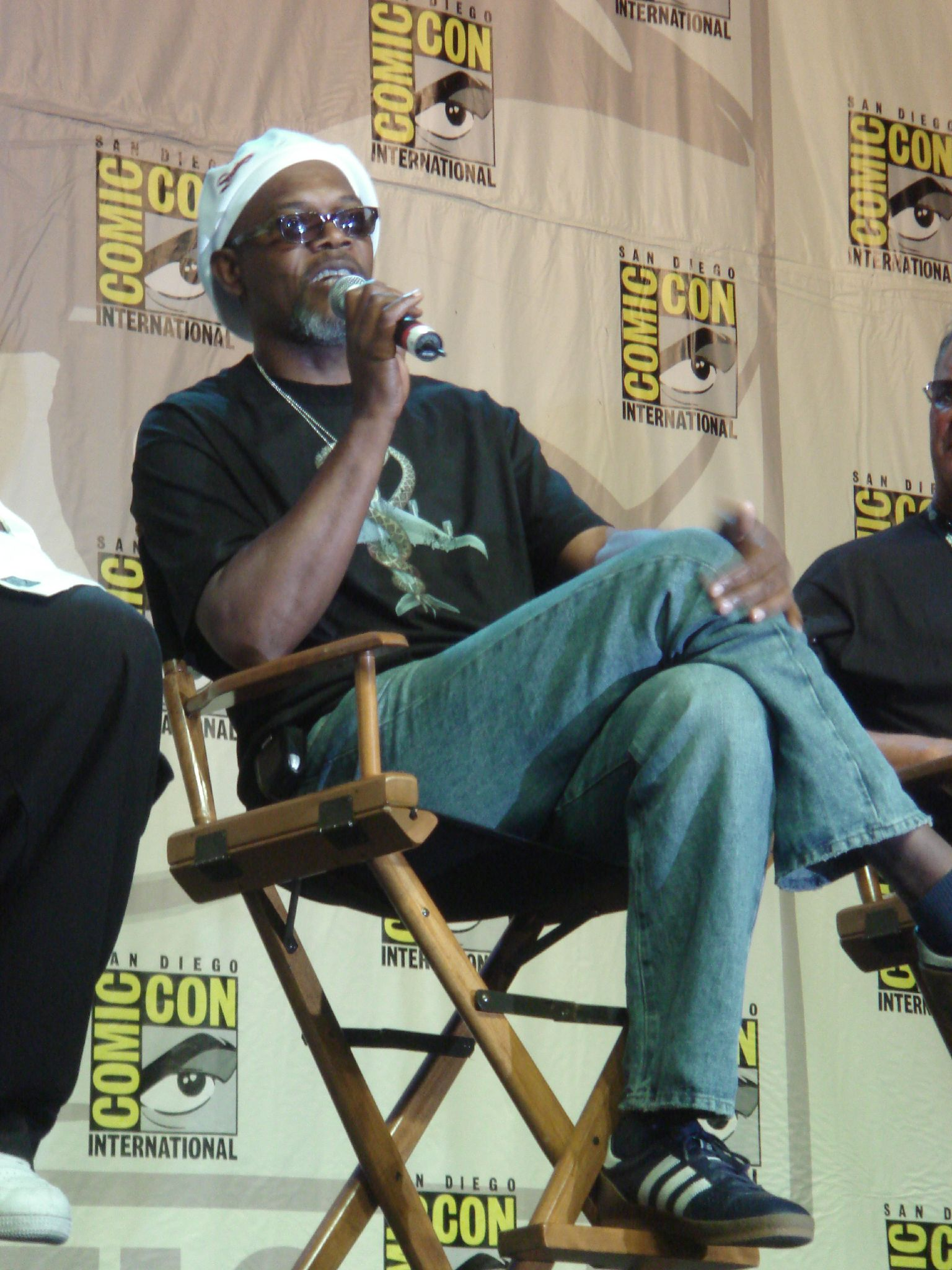
Samuel L. Jackson promoting the film at Comic-Con in July 2006

=== Print ===
An illustrated book from Thunder's Mouth Press, Snakes on a Plane: The Guide to the Internet Ssssssensation by David Waldon, details the Internet phenomenon and was published July 28, 2006. Waldon details various viral videos relating to the film's craze, and interviewed their producers to find out what about the film captured their attention.

=== Music ===
On March 16, 2006, New Line Cinema announced a contest on TagWorld and a website promoting the film. The contest allowed artists on TagWorld to have their music featured in the film. A flood of SoaP-themed songs were submitted by artists such as Captain Ahab (who ultimately won the contest), Louden Swain, the Former Fat Boys, Nispy, and others. In addition, a music video for the film's theme song, "Snakes on a Plane (Bring It)" by Cobra Starship, was released on July 10, 2006, on MTV2's Unleashed. The song appeared on the film's soundtrack and the video appeared during the film's closing credits.

In October 2005, Nathanial Perry and Chris Rohan recorded an audio trailer spoof, which helped fuel the Internet buzz. Perry and Rohan recorded the "motherfucking snakes" line in the audio trailer which was added to the film during the week of re-shoots. In July 2006, New Line Cinema signed a worldwide licensing agreement with the Cutting Corporation to produce an audiobook of the film.

=== Television ===
On August 15, 2006, Samuel L. Jackson guest featured on The Daily Show with Jon Stewart, opening with the film's catchphrase. Keith Olbermann featured stories about the film and Internet buzz several times on his MSNBC news program Countdown. In addition, G4's Attack of the Show! featured a semi-regular segment entitled "Snakes on a Plane: An Attack of the Show Investigation", and had a week dedicated to the film which included interviews and the appearance of hundreds of snakes on set.

=== Internet ===
Snakes on a Plane generated considerable buzz on the Internet after Josh Friedman's blog entry and mentions on several Internet portals. The title inspired bloggers to create songs, apparel, poster art, pages of fan fiction, parody films, mock movie trailers, and short film parody competitions. On July 6, 2006, the official Snakes on a Plane website started a promotional sweepstakes called "The #1 Fan King Cobra Sweepstakes". The contest made innovative use of the publicity-generating potential of the Internet, requiring contestants to post links on forums, blogs, and websites and collecting votes from the users of those sites.

Many of the early fan-made trailers and later other viral videos and commercials circulated via YouTube, and captured media attention there with such titles as: Cats on a Plane (which was featured in Joel Siegel's review of Snakes on a Plane on Good Morning America), Snakes Who Missed the Plane, All Your Snakes Are Belong To Us (a spoof of the All your base are belong to us phenomenon), Steaks on a Train, and Badgers on a Plane (a spoof of "Badger Badger Badger"). Several websites also held contests about the film in fan-submitted short films and posters.

In August 2006, Varitalk launched an advertising campaign in which fans could send a semi-personalized message in Jackson's voice to telephone numbers of their choosing. Within the first week, over 1.5 million calls were sent to participants.

=== Previews ===
In June 2006, New Line commissioned famed UK audio-visual film remixers and chop-up artists Addictive TV to cut and sample Snakes on a Plane to create trailers for the U.S. television networks. The official teaser trailer premiered before X-Men: The Last Stand, and the first official trailer appeared online on June 26, 2006. Another trailer circulated in July 2006, showing several of the snake attacks and a missing pilot and co-pilot. Rotten Tomatoes had video clips of the official trailers, as well as fan-made trailers.

During a July 21, 2006, panel discussion at San Diego Comic-Con, a preview clip from the film was shown to a crowd of more than 6,500 people. The panel included actors Samuel L. Jackson and Kenan Thompson, director David R. Ellis, and snake-handler Jules Sylvester.

== Release ==
"No movie shall triumph over Snakes on a Plane. Unless I happen to feel like making a movie called More Motherfucking Snakes on More Motherfucking Planes."

— Samuel L. Jackson, joking that the film would win the MTV Movie Award for "Best Film" in 2007

Snakes on a Plane had its premiere on August 17, 2006, at Grauman's Chinese Theatre. The film debuted on August 18, 2006. It opened in 3,555 theaters and had some late-night screenings on August 17. In a move meant to exploit the attention from the film, a straight-to-DVD Z-movie horror film with a supernatural twist, Snakes on a Train, was released on August 15, 2006, three days before the film's theatrical release.

=== Critical response ===
New Line Cinema did not screen the film for critics. As of August 2026, review aggregation website Rotten Tomatoes gives the film a score of 69% based on 178 reviews, with an average score of 6.20/10. The consensus reads: "Snakes on a Plane lives up to its title, featuring snakes on a plane. It isn't perfect, but then again, it doesn't need to be." On Metacritic, which uses a weighted average rating system out of 100, the film earned a score of 58 based on 31 reviews, indicating "mixed or average reviews". Reviewers reported audiences cheering, applauding, and engaging in "call and response", noting that audience participation was an important part of the film's appeal. Audiences surveyed by CinemaScore gave the film a grade of "B−" on scale of A to F.

The Arizona Republic's Randy Cordova gave the film a positive review, calling the film "... an exploitation flick that knows what it wants to do, and it gets the job done expertly." and a "... Mecca for B-movie lovers". Mick LaSalle of the San Francisco Chronicle enjoyed the film, asking his readers "... if you can find a better time at the movies this year than this wild comic thriller, let me in on it." Boston Globe reviewer Ty Burr reacted to Samuel L. Jackson's performance by saying he "... bestrides this film with the authority of someone who knows the value of honest bilge. He's as much the auteur of this baby as the director and screenwriters, and that fierce glimmer in his eye is partly joy."

Peter Travers of Rolling Stone gave the film one and a half stars out of four, saying that "after all the Internet hype about those motherfuckin' snakes on that motherfuckin' plane, the flick itself is a murky stew of shock effects repeated so often that the suspense quickly droops along with your eyelids." David Denby of The New Yorker claimed that the film "... may mark a new participatory style in marketing, but it still gulls an allegedly knowing audience with the pseudo-morality of yesteryear."

Film critic and radio host Michael Medved criticized New Line Cinema for agreeing to re-shoot scenes so that the film would receive an R rating from the Motion Picture Association of America to match fan expectations. He argued that the film would have grossed more revenue at the box office with a PG-13 rating, stating that the demographic most likely to be drawn to a movie titled Snakes on a Plane is males between the ages of 12 and 15. "My fourteen-year-old son, Danny, for instance, felt a powerful inclination to go out and see the movie with his two sleep-over friends this Sunday night," he explained, "but I wouldn't permit it. It's rated R for good reason." Medved ultimately awarded the film 2 1/2 stars out of 4 in a radio review, but said that he did so "grudgingly". Peter Bradshaw, in a three star review for The Guardian, described the film as a "cheerfully ridiculous thriller" and defied anyone not to laugh. Justin Chang for Variety described the film as a "tasteless, utterly depraved, no-nonsense sluts-and-guts extravaganza".

=== Box office ===
Due to the Internet hype surrounding the film, industry analysts estimated that the film's opening box office would be between US$20-30 million. Snakes on a Plane did not meet its estimates and grossed $15.25 million over its opening weekend, a disappointment for New Line Cinema. In its second weekend, the film fell to sixth place with $6.4 million, a more than fifty percent drop from its opening weekend revenue. By the end of its theatrical run, the film grossed $62,022,014 worldwide.

Robert K. Shaye, the founder of New Line, stated that he was "disappointed" that Snakes on a Plane was a "dud" despite "higher expectations". The press declared that Snakes on a Plane was a "box office disappointment", with The New York Times reporting that after all the "hype online, Snakes on a Plane is letdown at box office" and Entertainment Weekly reporting that the film was an "internet-only phenomenon". Box office analysts have subsequently referred to substantial internet discourse failing to materialize into box office as "the Snakes on a Plane effect".

=== Home media ===
Snakes on a Plane released on DVD December 26, 2006, in Region 2; December 28, 2006, in Region 4; and January 2, 2007, in Region 1. The DVD features commentaries, deleted and extended scenes, several featurettes, Cobra Starship's music video, and trailers. The U.S. Blu-ray was released on September 29, 2009.

A limited edition Ultra HD Blu-ray of the film was released by Arrow Video in January 20, 2026, featuring a 4K restoration of the film alongside a new audio commentary and a new mini-documentary.

=== TV version ===
The film received further attention when fans noticed the U.S. TV edit of the film purposely dubbed over profane language, replacing it with bowdlerized words for family audiences. An example is Samuel L. Jackson's line toward the end of the film, "I have had it with these motherfuckin' snakes on this motherfuckin' plane!", which is replaced with "I have had it with these monkey-fighting snakes on this Monday-to-Friday plane!".

=== Adaptations ===
Black Flame published the novelization of the film, written by Christa Faust. The 405–page novel contains significant backstories for the characters and introduces other characters that were not featured in the film. It won a Scribe Award in 2007 from the International Association of Media Tie-In Writers.

Comic book writer Chuck Dixon wrote a comic book adaptation of the film. DC Comics released the two-issue miniseries on August 16, 2006, and September 27, 2006, under their Wildstorm imprint.

== Soundtrack ==
Snakes on a Plane: The Album

Soundtrack album by Various artists
- Released: August 15, 2006
- Genre: Soundtrack
- Labels: Decaydance Records; New Line Records
- Producer: Jason Linn

Soundtrack
Review scores
Source	Rating
Allmusic	3/5 stars
RapReviews	6.5/10 stars

The soundtrack for the film was released on August 15, 2006. The enhanced portion of the CD contains what was considered the "best of the best" of the amateur Internet creations inspired by the film, including the songs "Snakes on the Brain" by Captain Ahab and "Here Come the Snakes (Seeing Is Believing)" by Louden Swain. The single "Snakes on a Plane (Bring It)" peaked at the 32nd position of Billboard's Hot Modern Rock Tracks in 2006.

1. "Snakes on a Plane (Bring It)" by Cobra Starship, William Beckett, Maja Ivarsson, Travie McCoy
2. "The Only Difference Between Martyrdom and Suicide Is Press Coverage" (Tommie Sunshine Brooklyn Fire Remix) by Panic! at the Disco
3. "Black Mamba" (Teddybears Remix) by The Academy Is...
4. "Ophidiophobia" by Cee-Lo Green
5. "Can't Take It" (The Baldwin Brothers "El Camino Prom Wagon" Remix) by The All-American Rejects
6. "Queen of Apology" (Patrick Stump Remix) by The Sounds
7. "Of All the Gin Joints in All the World" (Tommie Sunshine's Brooklyn Fire Retouch) by Fall Out Boy
8. "New Friend Request" (Hi-Tek Remix) by Gym Class Heroes
9. "Around the Horn" (Louis XIV Remix) by The Bronx
10. "Remember to Feel Real" (Machine Shop Remix) by Armor for Sleep
11. "Wine Red" (Tommie Sunshine's Brooklyn Fire Retouch) by The Hush Sound
12. "Bruised" (Remix) by Jack's Mannequin
13. "Final Snakes" by Shranky Drank
14. "Wake Up" (Acoustic) by Coheed and Cambria
15. "Lovely Day" by Donavon Frankenreiter
16. "Hey Now Now" by Michael Franti & Spearhead
17. "Snakes on a Plane - The Theme" (Score) by Trevor Rabin

== See also ==
- List of killer snake films
- Snakes on a Train, a 2006 direct-to-video film inspired by Snakes on a Plane
