= 1Nite (One Night) =

Single by Cobra Starship featuring My Name Is Kay

from the album Night Shades
- Released: May 15, 2012
- Genre: Dance pop
- Length: 3:39 (Album Version); 3:37 (Single Version)
- Label: Warner Bros.; Fueled by Ramen; Decaydance
- Songwriters: Cobra Starship; Ryan Tedder; Brent Kutzle
- Producers: Tedder; Kutzle

Cobra Starship singles chronology
"Middle Finger" (2012)	"1Nite (One Night)" (2012)	"Never Been in Love" (2014)

My Name Is Kay singles chronology
"My Name Is Kay" (2011)	"1Nite (One Night)" (2011)	"Strangers" (2012)

Music video
- "1Nite (One Night)" on YouTube

"#1Nite (One Night)" is a song by American dance rock band Cobra Starship, featuring Canadian singer-songwriter My Name Is Kay. It was released as the third and final single from Night Shades on May 15, 2012.

== Background ==
"#1Nite (One Night)" was originally released as a promotional single in Australia and New Zealand on July 26, 2011. On May 9, 2012, it was announced that the song would be officially released as the third and final single on May 15, from Night Shades. The album artwork was revealed via MTV on May 9. The group appeared on American drama television series 90210 to perform the track.

== Composition ==
"#1Nite (One Night)" was written by members of Cobra Starship along with Ryan Tedder and Brent Kutzle, who also produced the track. The song was originally titled as "One Night", however Gabe Saporta made a last minute decision to add a hashtag after it was suggested by the group's manager Alex Sarti who thought "could be an automatic trending topic." The album version runs for three minutes and 39 seconds. The single version features My Name Is Kay with a runtime of three minutes and 37 seconds. According to Saporta, him along with Tedder thought My Name Is Kay "would be perfect" for the song, who was also recently signed to Tedder's label Patriot Records. Additionally, Tedder added background vocals for the track.

== Critical reception ==
Professional ratings
Review scores
Source	Rating
PopCrush	3/5 stars

"#1Nite (One Night)" was met with mixed to positive reviews from music critics with some comparing it to Usher's "DJ Got Us Fallin' in Love". Aubrey Welbers of Alternative Press stated, "Thanks to Auto-Tune and a recycled beat, it would be tough to identify '#1Nite' as a Cobra Starship song if it were played between any of the ubiquitous empty dance tunes heard in clubs." Tim Sendra of AllMusic described it as "a lawsuit-friendly rip of Usher's 'DJ Got Us Fallin' in Love." Mikael Wood of Entertainment Weekly remarked, "The hooks here are undeniably sharp — especially on '#1Nite (One Night)', which swipes the melody from Usher's 'DJ Got Us Fallin' in Love'." Amanda Hensel of PopCrush stated, "Tedder's influence is obvious, and this track is undoubtedly meant to get your booty shaking in the club, but we don't think it's one we'd request with the DJ... Sure, dance tracks aren't known for their lyrics, but Tedder is -- and we think he and Cobra Starship can do better than this."

== Music video ==
The group released a home video for "#1Nite (One Night)" on May 8, 2012, and was directed by the band's guitarist, Ryland Blackinton. On June 20, 2012, the group announced that the official music video would be premiering on MTV. It was released the following the day. The video was shot in Las Vegas and portrays Gabe Saporta and My Name Is Kay as a couple, visiting a convenience mart, the arcade and partying at Caesars Palace.

== Chart performance ==
"#1Nite (One Night)" peaked at number 23 on the Billboard Bubbling Under Hot 100 and sold 91,000 copies as of May 2013.

== Track listing ==
Digital download
No.	Title	Length
1.	"#1Nite (One Night)" (featuring My Name Is Kay)	3:37

Promotional single
No.	Title	Length
1.	"#1Nite (One Night)"	3:39

== Personnel ==
Credits for "#1Nite (One Night)" adapted from album's liner notes.

Cobra Starship

- Gabe Saporta – lead vocals
- Ryland Blackinton – backing vocals, guitar, keyboard
- Victoria Asher – backing vocals, keytar
- Alex Suarez – bass, backing vocals, synthesizer
- Nate Novarro – drums

Additional musicians

- My Name Is Kay – featured artist
- Ryan Tedder – additional vocals, drums, guitar, bass
- Brent Kutzle – drums, guitar, bass

Production

- Cobra Starship – producer
- Ryan Tedder – producer, engineering, programming
- Brent Kutzle – producer, engineering, programming
- Kevin Porter – assistant engineering
- Serban Ghenea – mixing
- John Hanes – mixing
- Tim Roberts – assistant mixing
- Smith Carlson – engineering
- Chris Gehringer – mastering

== Charts ==
Chart performance for "1Nite (One Night)"
Chart (2011)	Peak position
US Bubbling Under Hot 100 (Billboard)	23

== Release history ==
Release dates and formats for "1Nite (One Night)"
Region	Date	Format	Label	Ref.
Australia	July 26, 2011	Digital download	Warner Bros.; Fueled by Ramen; Decaydance	
New Zealand	July 26, 2011	Digital download	Warner Bros.; Fueled by Ramen; Decaydance	
United States	May 15, 2012	Digital download	Warner Bros.; Fueled by Ramen; Decaydance	
United States	June 5, 2012	Mainstream airplay	Warner Bros.; Fueled by Ramen; Decaydance	
