= Forget What You Know =

Studio album by Midtown
- Released: June 29, 2004
- Recorded: November 2003
- Studio: Ruby Red, Midtown Atlanta
- Genre: Pop-punk; emo
- Length: 52:43
- Label: Columbia
- Producer: Butch Walker

Midtown chronology
Living Well Is the Best Revenge (2002)	Forget What You Know (2004)

Singles from Forget What You Know
- 1. "Give It Up" Released: May 18, 2004

Forget What You Know is the third studio album by American rock band Midtown. Following the release of Living Well Is the Best Revenge (2002), MCA was merged into Geffen Records, and the band was not picked up by the latter label. The group spent time writing on their next album and following a meeting with Butch Walker, moved to Atlanta, Georgia, to start recording the new material. Walker headed the producing helm and Forget What You Know was recorded in late 2003 at Ruby Red Studios. The album is classified as an emo and pop punk release; its songs were compared with those of Division of Laura Lee, Recover and Jimmy Eat World.

The release of Forget What You Know was announced in April 2004 and the band embarked on a US tour, during which "Give It Up" was released as a single, and a music video for the song was released after the tour finished. Forget What You Know was released on June 29, 2004, through Columbia Records; it reached number 109 on the Billboard 200 and "Give It Up" peaked at number 32 on the Alternative Songs radio chart. Music critics gave the album a mixed reception with some complimenting its energy and sound, and others finding it average. Midtown went on two other US tours and performed shows in Australia and the UK, and embarked upon another US tour in late 2004. A music video for "Empty Like the Ocean" was released in March 2005 and a headlining US tour and a stint on the Warped Tour followed.

== Background ==
In 1999, Midtown signed to the independent label Drive-Thru Records and released their debut album Save the World, Lose the Girl (2000) through it. Sometime afterwards, communication between the label and the group became difficult. Vocalist/bassist Gabe Saporta was concerned Drive-Thru were focussing their efforts on New Found Glory, which Saporta helped to sign with the label, rather than Midtown, and a public feud between Saporta and the label's founders Richard and Stefanie Reines ensued. Drive-Thru had a distribution deal with major label MCA Records that allowed MCA to acquire Drive-Thru Records' bands over a period of time. Midtown's next album Living Well Is the Best Revenge (2002) was a joint release by Drive-Thru and MCA.

According to drummer Rob Hitt, MCA had a few groups that performed well commercially and Drive-Thru "wanted to put every other band into that same cookie-cutter mold. And we didn't want that." Midtown later had negative experiences with the label, which wanted to feature the band in teen magazines. Around the time, MCA had acquired acts that were dissimilar to Drive-Thru's bands; MCA was investing in the less-successful groups and lost a substantial amount of money. Midtown then entered into a legal battle to leave Drive-Thru that lasted for a year. By mid-2003, MCA was absorbed by Universal Music Group subsidiary Geffen Records, and its staff and roster were moved to Geffen.

== Writing and recording ==
As the merger was occurring, Midtown was writing material for its next album. Geffen believed the group was inactive due to their break from touring, and did not pick up the band from MCA. Hitt said the band didn't wish to release a new album, despite "make it seem like we had all these things going on". Saporta said "as far as anyone cared, we were dead. No one gave a shit" about the group by the time they were working on the next album. Sometime afterwards, Midtown played a show with Butch Walker, after which Walker's manager started to manage the group. According to Saporta, after talking with Walker on another occasion, "he was like, 'Oh, I've heard your demos, I think they're great. I'd love to do your record' ". Saporta, having grown suspicious of people talking to him after the legal battle, was ambivalent to Walker's offer. By October 2003, the band considered themselves free agents. They temporarily moved to Atlanta, Georgia, where recording sessions were held at Ruby Red Studios in Midtown Atlanta with Walker and Russ T serving as engineers.

Despite not being fans of Walker's work, the group worked with him for the sessions. They wanted a rawer sound compared to the polished direction of the last two albums, both of which were produced by Mark Trombino. Saporta's said Walker's work was "all very slick" and they wanted to create something "a little more rock and roll". Saporta said they aimed to make the record for themselves and that "[we] were just like, 'Okay, we're going to make an awesome record for ourselves and prove something to ourselves,' and that's all we cared about." In addition to playing their usual instruments, Saporta did some programming and Hitt sang. With recording lasting three weeks in November, the group recorded 18 songs. All the recordings, but "Give it Up", were mixed by Walker and Russ T, and mastered by George Marino at Sterling Sound in New York City. "Give It Up" was mixed by Jay Baumgardner and mastered by Vlado Meller at Sony Music Studios, also in New York City.

== Composition ==
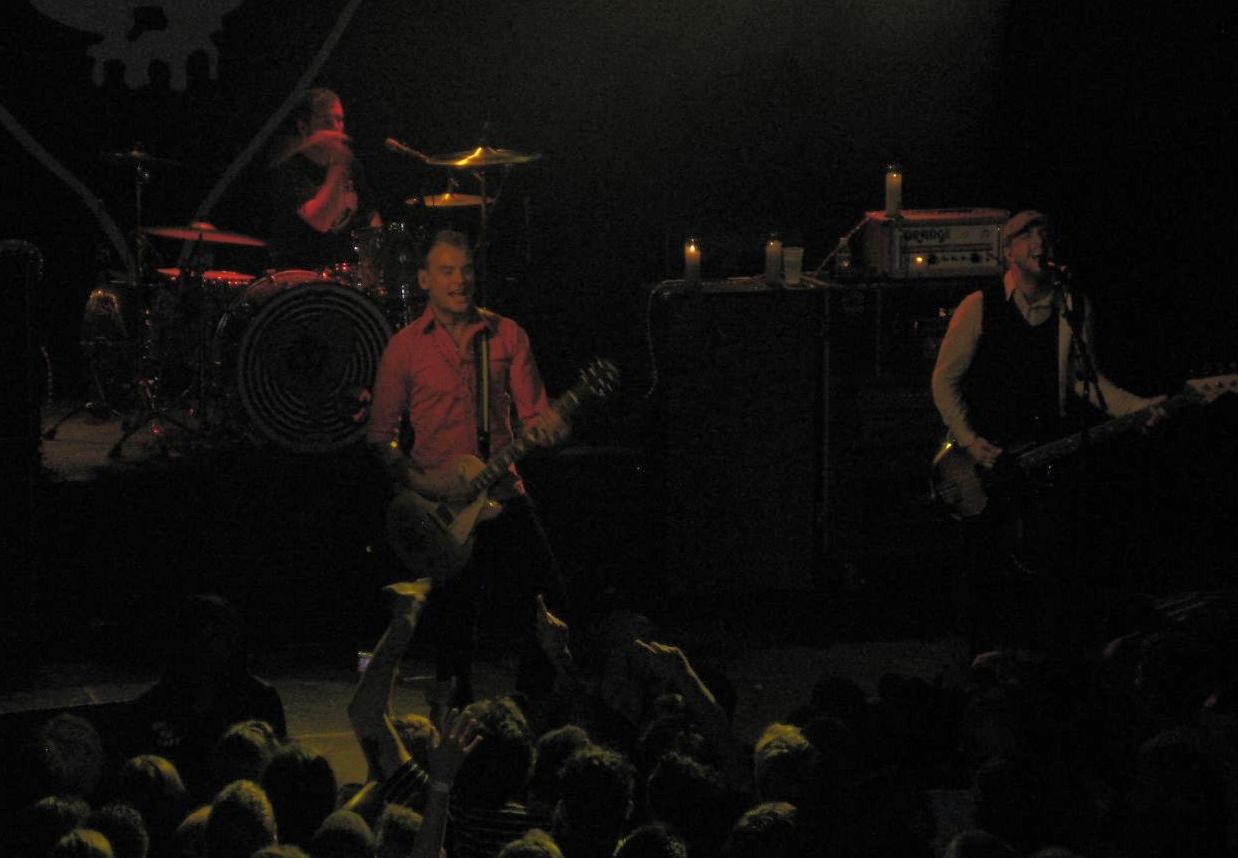
Comparisons between Forget What You Know and the work of Alkaline Trio (pictured) were drawn by music critics.

Forget What You Know has been described as emo and pop punk, having similarities with the work of Alkaline Trio. The album showcases more energy than the group's previous album and highlights a moody atmosphere, which was likely influenced by Midtown's battle with their former label. Saporta' vocals were compared to those of the Wallflowers' frontman Jakob Dylan and Millencolin, leaning to a wail. While writing the album, Saporta was "going through a tough time, where everything that I thought I knew was proven to be false and the world just started redefining itself". The album, which has a darker overtone than Midtown's earlier work, is about the "realization that the reality that I knew was fake ... [and that] you're always going to be okay, there's always going to be something that gets you through in your new reality".

Discussing the album title, the band said; "Forget what you know about the world; forget what you know about yourself. Forget what you think you know about Project Mayhem. Embrace nothingness, be everything." The opening track "Armageddon." acts as an introduction and has gang vocals shouting the phrase "So hard to believe you what you're looking for" before segueing into the post-punk track "To Our Savior", which is similar to the output of the Swedish band Division of Laura Lee. "Is It Me? Is It True?" features a toy piano and is followed by an instrumental interlude titled, "God Is Dead," which is an extrapolation of the vocal melody on the following track, "Whole New World." "Help Me Sleep" was compared to the work of the band Recover. The album's closing track "So Long as We Keep Our Bodies Numb We're Safe" ends with almost-10-minute-long loops of the phrases "You've had all the time in the world" and "You don't listen", and due to its loops and length has been compared to "Goodbye Sky Harbor" (1999) by Jimmy Eat World.

== Release and promotion ==
Forget What You Know was sent to several record labels in early 2004. On January 23, "Is It Me? Is It True?" was made available for download through AbsolutePunk. On April 7, the release of Forget What You Know was announced for June 2004, and that it would be released through Sony Music Entertainment imprint Columbia Records. In addition, the album's track listing was revealed. "Give It Up" was released as a single on May 18 that year. Between late April and early June 2004, Midtown went on a co-headlining US tour with Armor for Sleep and Your Enemies Friends; they were supported on select dates by Time and Distance, the Working Title, Stars Hide Fire, Vise Versa, Emanuel and Lance's Hero. Following this, they appeared at the Best Music Poll 2004 festival. On June 12, a music video for "Give It Up" was released, together with a behind-the-scenes "making of" video. Forget What You Know was released through Columbia Records on June 29, 2004. It was subsequently released in Australia on August 16, Canada on August 24, and in Germany and the UK on September 24.

To promote the album's release, Midtown performed a few in-store live shows. In July and August 2004, the band went on tour with Lostprophets and later played in Japan and Canada. In September and October, the group appeared on the Rock Against Bush tour in the US. The group then toured Australia and the UK with Hidden in Plain View. They returned to the US in November for a tour with Matchbook Romance and Hidden in Plain View. the Academy Is... and Name Taken appeared on select shows. In mid-December, the group played three shows with Paulson, Senses Fail and Moneen, and five shows with Fall Out Boy, the Academy Is... and Gym Class Heroes. In March and April 2005, the group performed across the US as part of the Fueled By Ramen & Friends Tour.

On March 18, 2005, a music video for "Empty Like the Ocean" was released. At the end of April, the group appeared at The Bamboozle festival before embarking on a headlining tour with Plain White T's, Action Action and Rock Kills Kid. The group was initially scheduled to appear on the Warped Tour between mid-June and mid-August but pulled out of all of the shows except the last five. The group disbanded later in the year, making Forget What You Know their last album release. In a 2006 interview, guitarist Heath Saraceno explained that "it veered far away from any sort of resemblance to a democracy that it once had. One person in particular took all the control, and the rest of us were just kinda stuck there trying to give input and being shut down at almost every turn". "Sister Golden Hair", a cover of the America song recorded during the album's sessions, was released in November 2006.

== Reception ==
Professional ratings
Review scores
Source	Rating
AllMusic	2.5/5 stars
Blender	3/5 stars
Melodic	3/5 stars
Ox-Fanzine	5/10
Punknews.org	3/5 stars
Rolling Stone	3/5 stars

Forget What You Know spent two weeks on the Billboard 200, peaking at number 109 on the chart dated July 17, 2004. "Give It Up" charted at number 32 on the Alternative Songs radio chart.

The album received mixed reviews from most music critics. Exclaim! writer Liz Worth said "There isn't a weak track here, but there are some that really shine", particularly "Empty Like the Ocean" and "Hey Baby, Don't You Know That We're All Whores". She also said the record would go down well with fans of punk's more melodic nature. Kaj Roth of Melodic found the album a "well produced" release with "energetic" sounds, like those found on an archetypal emo record. With neither any stand-outs or bad songs, Roth said Forget What You Know is a "solid good album to listen to".

In a review for Blender, journalist Maura Johnston said the album only missteps when the tempo "slows down and [Midtown's] peppy embrace of nihilism and nothingness stops pogoing". Ox-Fanzine's Kid Dynamite viewed it as "unfortunately only mediocre", noting the "catchy melodies, polyphonic vocals, variety … the whole thing never seems too pop". Punknews.org writer Brian Shultz said Saporta's vocals had "gone absolutely berserk. It almost sounds like he's trying to reach pitches he's incapable of making." He regarded it as "more fluid and energized" than the group's preceding album but said it is "hardly as bold or invigorating" as their debut release. AllMusic reviewer Johnny Loftus complimented the group's "leaner, more moody sound" despite them abandoning "sugar-high" hooks for "less direct yet still succinct songcraft". Loftus said the release is not "a sun-and-sand summertime record" but it set the stage for "kids making the transition from goofy preteen pop-punk to bands like the Alkaline Trio".

== Track listing ==
All lyrics by Gabe Saporta. All music by Midtown. All songs produced by Butch Walker.

No.	Title	Length
1.	"Armageddon."	0:45
2.	"To Our Savior"	2:47
3.	"Give It Up"	3:39
4.	"Is It Me? Is It True?"	3:08
5.	"God Is Dead"	1:04
6.	"Whole New World"	3:38
7.	"Empty Like the Ocean"	4:27
8.	"Nothing Is Ever What It Seems"	3:37
9.	"The Tragedy of the Human Condition"	1:09
10.	"Waiting for the News"	2:59
11.	"Until It Kills"	3:51
12.	"Hey Baby, Don't You Know That We're All Whores"	2:37
13.	"Help Me Sleep"	3:04
14.	"Manhattan"	2:39
15.	"So Long as We Keep Our Bodies Numb We're Safe"	13:13
Total length:		52:43

== Personnel ==
Personnel per booklet.

Midtown

- Robert Hitt – drums, vocals
- Tyler Rann – guitar, vocals
- Gabe Saporta – lead vocals, bass, programming
- Heath Saraceno – guitar, vocals

Production

- Butch Walker – producer, engineer, mixing
- Russ T – engineer, mixing
- George Marino – mastering
- Jay Baumgardner – mixing (track 3)
- Vlado Meller – mastering (track 3)
- Alan Ferguson – photos

== Charts ==
Chart (2004)	Peak position
US Billboard 200	109

== Release history ==
Region	Date	Label	Format	Ref.
United States	June 29, 2004	Columbia	CD, DL	
Australia	August 16, 2004	Columbia	CD, DL	
Canada	August 24, 2004	Columbia	CD, DL	
Germany	September 24, 2004	Columbia	CD, DL	
UK	September 24, 2004	Columbia	CD, DL	
