= Midtown (band) =

American pop-punk band

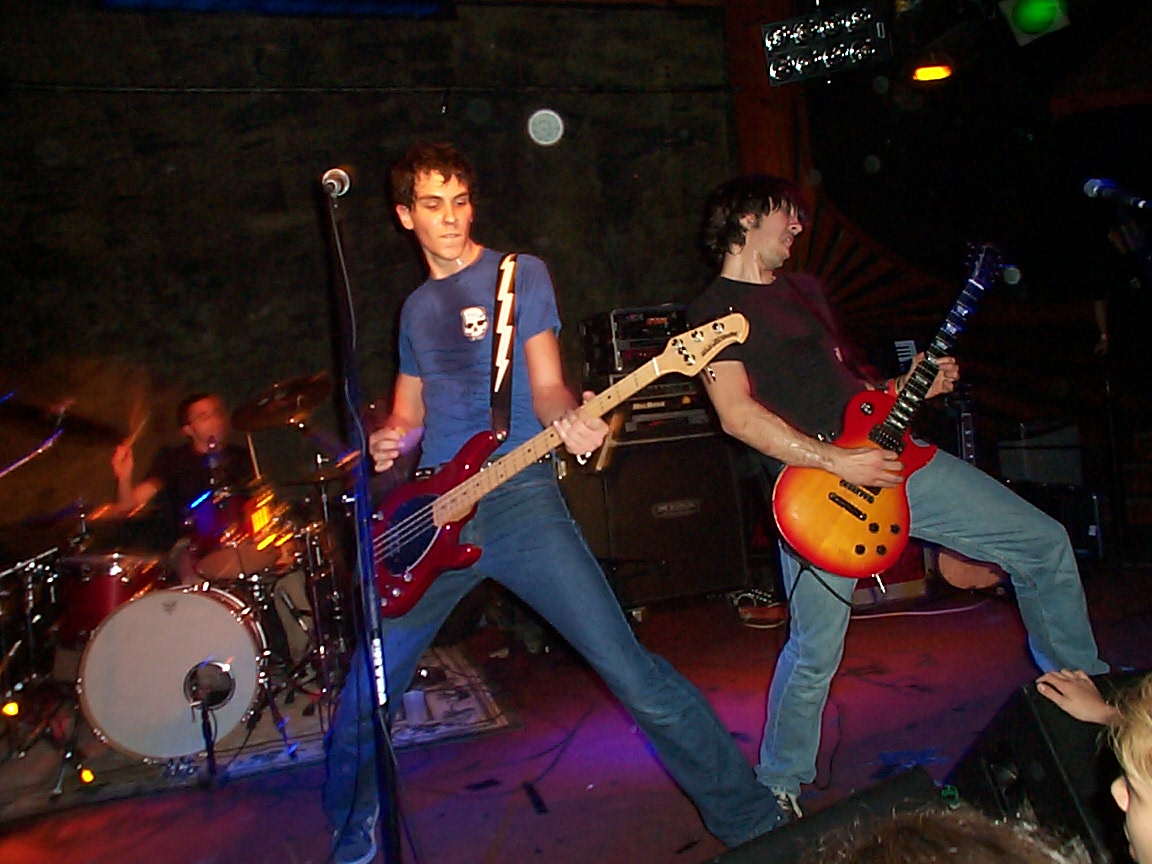
- Midtown performing in 2000

Background information
- Origin: New Brunswick, New Jersey, U.S.
- Genres: Pop-punk; punk rock; alternative rock; emo
- Years active: 1998–2005, 2014, 2022–present
- Labels: Pinball; Drive-Thru; MCA; Columbia
- Spinoffs: Cobra Starship
- Members: Gabe Saporta; Tyler Rann; Heath Saraceno; Rob Hitt
- Website: midtownrock.com

Midtown is an American pop-punk band from New Brunswick, New Jersey. Midtown was formed in November 1998 by three Rutgers University students, but quickly became a quartet. The group released three full-length studio albums and three extended plays before disbanding in 2005. In early 2014, Midtown reunited to play three shows, the first as a secret show at The Knitting Factory in Brooklyn, and the two remaining at the Skate And Surf Festival. They reunited for more shows in 2022 as openers on My Chemical Romance's Reunion Tour.

== History ==
Midtown was formed in 1998 by Rutgers University students Gabe Saporta (vocals/bass), Rob Hitt (drums), and Tyler Rann (guitar/vocals). The group added Heath Saraceno on guitar/vocals, and used its roots in the New Jersey punk scene to develop a sound that combined elements of pop-punk and punk rock. Midtown began recording shortly after its formation. The band's first EP, The Sacrifice of Life, was released by Pinball Records in 1999, followed by a debut album, Save the World, Lose the Girl, released in early 2000 by the American independent record label Drive-Thru Records. The band was then upstreamed to major label MCA Records for its following album, Living Well Is the Best Revenge (2002).

Midtown's next album, Forget What You Know (2004), was produced while the band was not under contract with a record label and was later picked up by Columbia Records. This was the band's final studio album; they disbanded shortly after its release in 2005. Former frontman Gabe Saporta then became the lead singer of the alternative dance/synthpop band Cobra Starship, which disbanded in November 2015. Former guitarist Heath Saraceno joined the band Senses Fail in 2005 but decided to leave them in 2009 to pursue personal endeavors. Tyler Rann went on to sing for Band of Thieves with some friends but eventually left the music business and now works in the fashion/clothing industry.

=== Brief reunions ===
On February 17, 2014, Gabriel Saporta announced that Midtown has reunited and performed at the Skate and Surf Festival. On March 9, 2022, My Chemical Romance announced that Midtown would be a supporting act for the US leg of their reunion tour in fall 2022. As well as doing their own headlining shows for their 2022 Resurrection Tour, along with playing at the 2023 Adjacent beach festival in Atlantic City, New Jersey.

== Musical style and influences ==
Midtown's style combines elements of emo and hardcore punk. AllMusic categorized the band's sound as "power emo". The band have cited numerous bands and artists as influences, including the Get Up Kids, the Promise Ring, Lifetime, Jets to Brazil, Kid Dynamite, Lagwagon, Pavement, and Elvis Costello.

== Members ==
- Gabe Saporta – lead vocals, bass guitar (1998–2005; 2014; 2022–present)
- Tyler Rann – vocals, guitars (1998–2005; 2014; 2022–present)
- Heath Saraceno – vocals, guitars (1998–2005; 2014; 2022–present)
- Rob Hitt – drums, percussion (1998–2005; 2014; 2022–present)
- Benjamin Litchman – bass guitar (2023–present)

== Discography ==
Studio albums

- Save the World, Lose the Girl (2000)
- Living Well Is the Best Revenge (2002)
- Forget What You Know (2004)

EPs

- The Sacrifice of Life (1999)
- Donots vs. Midtown Split 7" (2000)
- Millencolin/Midtown Split (2001)
- New.Old.Rare. (2002)
- We’re Too Old To Write New Songs, So Here’s Some Old Songs We Didn’t Write (2023)

Compilation appearances

- Rock Music: A Tribute to Weezer (2002; "Susanne" by Weezer)
- Picking Up the Pieces (2003; acoustic version of "Living in Spite")
- Liberation (Songs to Benefit PETA) (2003; "This House Is Not a Home")
- Punk Goes Acoustic (2003; acoustic version of "Knew It All Along")
- Punk Goes 80s (2005; cover of "Your Love" by The Outfield)

== Post-Midtown projects ==
- Cobra Starship became the new project of Midtown's bassist and lead singer, Gabe Saporta. The first single from the soundtrack for the movie Snakes on a Plane, was the band's song "Bring It (Snakes on a Plane)". Their first album, While the City Sleeps, We Rule the Streets released on October 10, 2006, their second album ¡Viva La Cobra! came out on October 23, 2007, their third album, Hot Mess, came out on August 11, 2009, and their fourth album, Night Shades, came out on August 29, 2011. The band ultimately broke up on November 10, 2015.
- Heath Saraceno played guitar and shared vocal duties in the New Jersey–based rock band Senses Fail until leaving the band after the 2009 Warped Tour.
- Rob Hitt works for Crush Management and also has a record label, I Surrender Records. The label has signed I Am The Avalanche, Four Year Strong, and Valencia.
- Tyler Rann started a band in 2006/2007 called ‘Band of Thieves’.
