= Night Shades =

Studio album by Cobra Starship
- Released: August 29, 2011
- Genres: Electropop; dance-pop; pop rock; dance-rock
- Length: 39:32
- Labels: Warner Bros.; Fueled by Ramen; Decaydance
- Producers: Cobra Starship; Steve Mac; Ryan Tedder; Brent Kutzle; Matthew Katsikas; Ari Levine; Grant Michaels; Adam Pallin; Stargate

Cobra Starship chronology
Hot Mess (2009)	Night Shades (2011)

Singles from Night Shades
- 1. "You Make Me Feel..." Released: May 10, 2011; 2. "Middle Finger" Released: January 3, 2012; 3. "1Nite (One Night)" Released: May 15, 2012

Night Shades is the fourth and final studio album by American dance-rock band Cobra Starship, released through Fueled by Ramen and Decaydance Records on August 29, 2011. The album is the follow-up of 2009's Hot Mess. The first single from the album, "You Make Me Feel...", features singer Sabi and was released on May 10, 2011. The full album was made available to stream for free on their Facebook page prior to its release.

The album debuted at number 50 on the Billboard 200 with 9,000 sales in its first week, but fell to number 185 in its second week. Following a pre-show performance on MTV's 2011 Video Music Awards, their single "You Make Me Feel..." reached the top 10 of the US Billboard Hot 100 and become their second top 10 hit at number seven. The band was the opening act for Justin Bieber in October through South America. The third single "#1Nite" has garnered more than 91,000 downloads to date.

== Background ==
The group's third studio album, Hot Mess, released in 2009 through Decaydance/Fueled by Ramen, debuted at number four on the Billboard 200. The album was preceded by its lead single, "Good Girls Go Bad", which featured Gossip Girl actress Leighton Meester and peaked at number seven on the Billboard Hot 100 with more than 2 million copies sold, according to Nielsen SoundScan. After the success, Cobra Starship frontman Gabe Saporta said of the aftermath of Hot Mess: "That caused me to lose my girlfriend, who I had been with since before Cobra started."

The band started writing Night Shades in September 2010, but during these initial sessions, Saporta wasn't happy with what they were creating. "We had a lot of songs that just felt uninspired to me," he stated. "It felt like I was just doing it to do it, because that's what we do, we're a band." He confessed that his solution for inspiration was embarking on what he describes as a "spiritual detox" in South America. "I went on this, like, pretty crazy... I don't know if you call it a retreat, but I lived in a little house in the forest in Brazil, and all I ate was rice for 10 days."

In the end, the trip gave Saporta "clarity" and made him feel "rejuvenated"—two things he needed to survive the studio mishaps Cobra Starship experienced after he returned. First, the band set up shop in an abandoned floor of a building owned by a friend's family—but two weeks into recording, they were unexpectedly met by a demolition crew. Their next attempt at setting up studio space unwittingly ended up being adjacent to a place rented by a masseuse. Finally, the band found a home in a converted storage space on the ground floor of Saporta's building.

Once the band settled into their permanent digs, Saporta started delving into the issues he started dissecting in South America—and found a way to address them from a unique perspective. "When I was writing in September, the problem was [that] it was either uninspired or it was really depressing," he explains. "It was about the fact that I lost the love of my life. As much as I need to deal with that, I don't think the whole world needs to deal with that. It's very self-serving just for me to make a record for that. If I would have just written that without taking my spiritual detox in the jungle, we would have had a record that would've just been that."

Speaking of Night Shades, Saporta commented, "This record might be the most commercial record, but also our most honest." Fueled by Ramen president John Janick was quoted as saying, "[Cobra Starship] delivered an album that has the Cobra sound but delivers those radio records" and thought that "there are multiple singles on [the] album."

During an interview with Alicia Fiorletta from The Aquarium, Alex Suarez commented about the album:

"I think we've massaged our writing process a whole lot more. Basically, we started writing this album a long time ago. Ryland and myself would get together to make some songs, then we'd pass it off to Gabe and then he would work on some lyrical concepts and then we would demo it. So we get a huge barrel of songs put together and then he picks the best ones to write off of until it just dwindles down. This time around, we got our own studio space, basically. Ryland and I would go in and produce the final tracks during the day and Gabe would go in at night and track vocals, so we'd sort of tag-team them. Then we also would use our own little home studio set up and do a lot of the production stuff there."

=== Music and production ===
Saporta and the band worked with multiple producers; he confirmed Kara DioGuardi (who co-produced the band's 2009 hit "Good Girls Go Bad") and OneRepublic's Ryan Tedder as collaborators. As for inspirations, Saporta cited the "attitude toward making music" displayed by electronic duo Major Lazer. "Stylistically, I think that we're definitely a band that's about making people have a good time, and we definitely want it to feel like a party," Saporta says. "But we also want to experiment with those sounds and make sure that it stays fresh, too." "Fool Like Me" has a slow rhythm, electronic keyboard sounds, story-telling lyrics, and high-pitched accompaniment from The Plastiscines. "Anything for Love" is a heavily synthesized nod to 1980s new wave, and has been compared to New Order and OMD. Other songs on the album include "Disaster Boy", resembling a sound featured on Hot Mess with its more alternative sounds and female vocals; "Don't Blame the World, It's the DJ's Fault" sounds similar to "Fool Like Me" with its slower rhythm; and "You Belong to Me", the upbeat ballad of the album.

== Release ==
On May 9, 2011, Cobra Starship announced via Twitter that the new album will be called Night Shades. On July 21, the group revealed the track list for the album and announced it would be released on August 30. However, prior to their performance at the 2011 MTV Video Music Awards, the release date for the album was pushed up a day earlier than originally announced. It was streamed via their Facebook page on August 28.

=== Singles ===
"You Make Me Feel..." was released as the first single from the album on May 10, 2011. Written by Steve Mac and Ina Wroldsen, it features American singer-songwriter and rapper Sabi. The song peaked at number seven on the Billboard Hot 100 and sold 1.4 million copies in the US. It also debuted at number one in New Zealand. The song was certified triple platinum by the Recording Industry Association of America.

"Middle Finger" was released as the album's second single on January 3, 2012. Featuring American rapper Mac Miller, the song reached number 14 on the US Bubbling Under Hot 100.

On May 15, 2012, "#1Nite (One Night)" was released as the third and final single from the album. This version features My Name Is Kay. The song peaked at number 23 on the US Bubbling Under Hot 100.

=== Promotional singles ===
The band engaged in a staged rollout for Night Shades, offering fans sneak peeks of the album through pre-release tracks or promotional singles starting with "#1Nite (One Night)" on July 26, "Fool Like Me" (featuring Plastiscines) on August 9 and "Middle Finger" (featuring Mac Miller) on August 23, available exclusively through iTunes, where fans were able to download them with the option to complete the album on release date for the remainder of the album price. "Don't Blame the World, It's the DJ's Fault" was released separately onto iTunes on August 29, 2011, the day of Night Shades's release.

== Critical reception ==
Professional ratings
Aggregate scores
Source	Rating
Metacritic	(63/100)
Review scores
Source	Rating
AllMusic	3.5/5 stars
Alternative Press	2.5/5 stars
Blogcritics	(positive)
Entertainment Weekly	B−
Metromix	3/5 stars
Rolling Stone	3/5 stars

Night Shades received generally favorable reviews from most music critics. At Metacritic, which assigns a normalized rating out of 100 to reviews from mainstream critics, the album received an average score of 63, based on 4 reviews. Tim Sendra from AllMusic gave to the album 3.5 out of 5 stars, declaring that "packing so many WTFs into one ten-song record is hardly fair, a bit reckless, and ultimately (amazingly) successful." He also wrote that the album "is ridiculously fun and light, sure to spawn at least a couple of songs you'll want to play at ironic dance parties, summer blowouts, and maybe even over headphones when you need some (mostly) mindless cheering up. What more could you want from Pop music?." Megan Rozell from Blogcritics was positive, stating that the album "transforms Cobra Starship from an alternative band to a work-in-progress pop sensation," while declaring that the album "is worth the listen."

Mikael Wood from Entertainment Weekly wrote that "the hooks here are undeniably sharp, but Cobra were more fun as party crashers than they are as VIPs." Kirk Miller from Metromix wrote that "the record is full of Auto-Tune, club beats, some '80s retro-pop, guest stars galore, and a sinking feeling that the entire process was hatched by someone's marketing department." Aubrey Welbers from Alternative Press wrote a mixed review, stating that the album "is a meticulously orchestrated dance record", and that "Cobra Starship have misplaced their unique tongue-in-cheek sensibilities; it feels like they’re killing time with safe, indistinguishable club tracks and pop ballads."

== Track listing ==
No.	Title	Writer(s)	Producer(s)	Length
1.	"You Belong to Me"	Cobra Starship	Cobra Starship	4:35
2.	"You Make Me Feel..." (featuring Sabi)	Steve Mac, Ina Wroldsen	Steve Mac	3:36
3.	"#1Nite (One Night)"	Cobra Starship, Ryan Tedder, Brent Kutzle	Ryan Tedder, Brent Kutzle, Matthew Katsikas	3:39
4.	"Fool Like Me" (featuring Plastiscines)	Cobra Starship, Ari Levine, Albert Winkler, Grant Michaels, Adam Pallin	Cobra Starship, Ari Levine, Grant Michaels, Adam Pallin	3:40
5.	"Anything for Love"	Cobra Starship	Cobra Starship	4:11
6.	"Middle Finger" (featuring Mac Miller)	Cobra Starship, Tor Erik Hermansen, Mikkel S. Eriksen, Malcolm McCormick, Nate Walka	Stargate	3:33
7.	"Don't Blame the World, It's the DJ's Fault"	Cobra Starship	Cobra Starship	3:36
8.	"Fucked in Love"	Cobra Starship, Kara DioGuardi	Cobra Starship	4:17
9.	"Disaster Boy"	Cobra Starship, Frank Staniszewski	Cobra Starship	3:44
10.	"Shwick" (featuring Jump Into the Gospel)	Cobra Starship, Johanna Fateman, JD Samson, Jump Into the Gospel	Cobra Starship	4:42
Total length:				39:32

Bonus track
No.	Title	Length
11.	"You Make Me Feel..." (featuring Sabi) (Futurecop Remix)	4:02

Deluxe edition bonus tracks
No.	Title	Length
11.	"Middle Finger" (Bingo Players Remix)	5:13
12.	"Anything for Love" (Cobra Starship Mix featuring Shaggy)	3:47
13.	"You Make Me Feel..." (Futurecop Remix featuring Sabi)	4:02
14.	"You Make Me Feel..." (featuring Sabi) (music video)	3:35
Total length:		56:14

== Personnel ==
Credits adapted from album's liner notes.

Cobra Starship

- Gabe Saporta – lead vocals
- Ryland Blackinton – guitar, backing vocals and synthesizer
- Alex Suarez – bass, synthesizer and backing vocals
- Nate Novarro – drums
- Victoria Asher – keytar and vocals

Additional musicians

- Sabi – "You Make Me Feel..."
- Ryan Tedder – "#1Nite (One Night)"
- Plastiscines – "Fool Like Me"
- Mac Miller – "Middle Finger"
- Jump Into the Gospel – "Schwick"

Production

- Cobra Starship – producer, mixing (1, 8–11)
- Steve Mac – producer
- Ryan Tedder – producer
- Brent Kutzle – producer
- Ari Levine – producer
- Matthew Katsikas - producer
- Grant Michaels – producer
- Adam Pallin – producer
- Stargate – producer
- Chris Gehringer – mastering
- Ben Liscio – engineer (1, 4–11)
- Blast Off Productions – engineer (1, 4–11)
- Mark Obriski – art design
- David J. Harrigan III – design

== Charts ==
Chart performance for Night Shades
Chart (2011)	Peak position
Australian Hitseekers Albums (ARIA)	6
New Zealand Albums (RMNZ)	39
US Billboard 200	50

== Certifications ==
Certifications and sales for Night Shades
Region	Certification	Certified units/sales
New Zealand (RMNZ)	Gold	7,500^{‡}
^{‡} Sales+streaming figures based on certification alone.

== Release history ==
Release dates and formats for Night Shades
Region	Date	Format	Label	Ref.
Various	August 29, 2011	Digital download	Decaydance; Fueled by Ramen	
United States	August 29, 2011	CD	Decaydance; Fueled by Ramen	
Canada	August 29, 2011	CD	Decaydance; Fueled by Ramen	
United Kingdom	Digital download	October 28, 2011	Decaydance; Fueled by Ramen	
Japan	CD	February 22, 2012	Decaydance; Fueled by Ramen	
