= Living Well Is the Best Revenge =

Studio album by Midtown
- Released: April 16, 2002
- Recorded: October–November 2001
- Studio: Larrabee East, Los Angeles, California; Media Vortex, Burbank, California
- Genre: Pop-punk; emo
- Length: 37:53
- Label: Drive-Thru; MCA
- Producer: Mark Trombino

Midtown chronology
Save the World, Lose the Girl (2000)	Living Well Is the Best Revenge (2002)	Forget What You Know (2004)

Living Well Is the Best Revenge is the second studio album by American rock band Midtown. Following the conclusion of the touring cycle of their debut album Save the World, Lose the Girl (2000), the group went to California to work on their next album. Sessions were held at Larrabee East, Los Angeles, California, and Media Vortex, Burbank, California with producer Mark Trombino. It followed the pop punk sound of their debut, and was compared to Good Charlotte and Fenix TX.

Preceded by two songs, and a supporting slot for Face to Face, Living Well Is the Best Revenge was released on Drive-Thru and MCA Records on April 16, 2002. It reached number 90 on the Billboard 200. The album received generally positive reviews from music critics, many of which commented on the melodies and harmonies. A music video for "Like a Movie" was released the following month. Throughout the rest of the year, the group toured mainland Europe (as part of the Deconstruction Tour), the US (twice) and the UK.

== Background and production ==
Midtown released their debut album Save the World, Lose the Girl through independent label Drive-Thru Records on February 15, 2000. Initial promotion consisted of supporting slots for New Found Glory, All and Reel Big Fish, and an appearance on that year's Warped Tour. In May 2001, the band released a split EP with Millencolin, which featured two new songs ("Get It Together" and "You Should Know"). Following this, they performed on Warped Tour for the second time in July, before a supporting slot for Blink-182 in July and August. After the conclusion of this trek, the band traveled to California, where they spent three weeks in pre-production working on 20 songs, which had been whittled down from 30.

Recording took place in October and November 2001 at Larrabee East in Los Angeles, California and Media Vortex in Burbank, California. Sessions were produced by Mark Trombino, and engineered by Trombino and Justin Smith. They were assisted by engineers Pete Novak and Dave Ahlert. Trombino, having previous experience as a drummer in Drive Like Jehu, focused on getting a perfect drum sound with Hitt. They had recorded it over two-and-a-half months, in contrast to the 20 days they had to record Save the World, Lose the Girl. Trombino remarked that it was a shame they did not have any time to experiment for that album; Saporta said they "really got to see what he was all about" for Living Well Is the Best Revenge, "which was awesome because we got the full Trombino treatment". One example he cited was when they brought an organ into the studio for a single day, only to use it for a ten-second part. Trombino mixed the recordings at Extasy South in Los Angeles in December 2001 and early 2002. Brian Gardner mastered the recordings at Bernie Grundman Mastering in Hollywood, California with assistance from Mike Bozzi. Vinnie Caruana of the Movielife added additional backing vocals to "Find Comfort in Yourself".

== Composition ==
Living Well Is the Best Revenge continued the pop punk sound of their debut, earning comparisons to Good Charlotte and Fenix TX. All of the music was written credited to the band, while vocalist/bassist Gabe Saporta wrote all of the lyrics with two exceptions: "Perfect" and "Find Comfort in Yourself" by guitarist Hearth Saraceno, and "One Last Time" by guitarist Tyler Rann. Saporta said the opening track "Become What You Hate" is about the various types of people who compromise their own personal beliefs for success and "liberating yourself from those people". The song's intro recalled Eric Martin Band's "Sucker for a Pretty Face". It is followed by two rock tracks: "Still Trying" and "Get It Together".

"Like a Movie" is about a woman who suffers a traumatic event and ends up in a vulnerable position. The pop-orientated "There's No Going Back" is followed by "Perfect", a Weezer-lite ballad that is sung by Saraceno. The slow-tempo "One Last Time", which was reminiscent of SR-71, is sung by Rann. "A Faulty Foundation" is the hardest and fastest number on the record, and talks about lost love. The penultimate track "In the Songs" is an ode to the band's friends in New Jersey for endorsing them over the years. The closing song "Find Comfort in Yourself" is a punk rock track.

== Release ==
Leading up to New Years Day 2002, the band embarked on a brief east coast tour, in addition to playing some shows with Good Charlotte and Mest. In January 2002, the band toured across mainland Europe, and returned to the US where they supported Jimmy Eat World. On February 19, 2002, "Become What You Hate" was made available for streaming through the group's website. On March 24, "A Faulty Foundation" was posted online. In April and May, the group supported Face to Face on their headlining US tour; the trek included an appearance at Skate and Surf Fest. Living Well Is the Best Revenge was released on April 16 as a joint release between Drive-Thru and MCA Records. At the time, Drive-Thru had a distribution deal with MCA Records. The deal allowed MCA to acquire Drive-Thru Records' bands over a period of time. Rann mentioned that the sole tie that they had with Drive-Thru at this point was the label being contractually obliged to have their logo on the back cover of the album, and he had not "spoken to any of the people there in over a year". Best Buy sold the album at a reduced cost alongside albums by their contemporaries Jimmy Eat World and Fenix TX.

The following day, the band held an interview with AbsolutePunk where they discussed their disintegrating relationship with Drive-Thru and their appraisal of MCA. It was removed and later reappeared on the website Born Backwards a few days later. When Punknews.org reported on the interview, a firm on behalf of Drive-Thru threatened to sue some of their users for libel if they did not remove specific comments. Shortly afterwards, Drive-Thru posted their response directly on Born Backwards. Rann said the label's response was "really terrible because not only was it a completely different thing about personal things but on top of it, it wasn’t even true". On May 6, the group filmed a music video for "Like a Movie" with director Ross Richardson in Los Angeles. The clip was posted online to the band's website at the end of the month.

In June, the band toured across Europe as part of the Deconstruction Tour, and then trekked through the continent with the Movielife. In August, the group performed at the Reading and Leeds Festivals in the UK. In September and October, the group went on a headlining US tour, titled the Best Revenge Tour. They were supported by Taking Back Sunday, Recover and Armor for Sleep. To help promote the tour, the band held a contest where a person could win signed memorabilia and a personal phone call. Partway through the trek, Taking Back Sunday were forced to drop off and were replaced by the Reunion Show. Following this, the group embarked on a UK tour with Recover to close the year. In April 2003, the group performed at Skate and Surf Fest. Between early July and early September, the group supported Reggie and the Full Effect on their headlining US tour.

== Reception ==
Professional ratings
Review scores
Source	Rating
AllMusic	3/5 stars
Ink 19	Favorable
Kerrang!	Favorable
Melodic	3.5/5 stars
The Michigan Daily	3/5 stars
Modern Fix	Favorable
PopMatters	Mixed
Punknews.org	4/5 stars
Slant Magazine	2.5/5 stars

Living Well Is the Best Revenge charted at number 90 on the Billboard 200, selling 11,153 copies in its first week. It has appeared on best-of emo/pop punk album lists by Houston Press and Loudwire.

Living Well Is the Best Revenge received generally positive reviews from music critics. Modern Fix called it "too poppy", before clarifying that they've "listened to this album way too many times to justify that as a negative comment." It liked the "lighthearted lyrics" that support the "soft and strong" melodies, "which is cool but feels overdone." Margie Libling of Ink 19 wrote that it was a "perfect blend of melodic yet driven tracks" signalling itself out as "an original and distinct album." The intertwining lead vocals resulted in "really great harmonies." Lollipop Magazine writer Scott Hefflon said it was "mostly straight-up cutesy punkpop".

Punknews.org staff member Scott Heisel complimented Trombino's "crystal clear" production, enabling the group to come across "as loud as possible" while still leaving "space for [them] to grow". Melodic's Johan Wippsson viewed the band as more enjoyable to listen to than their peers, finding the tracks were "on a good level all through[out]". Kerrang! writer Paul Travers saw the record as something "so sweet and sugary that it could turn your radiant smile into tombstone stumps". The "saccharine melodies and vocal harmonies" could make the listener "quite ill," if they were not "accompanied by rarely less than buzzing energy levels and some seriously addictive hooks."

AllMusic reviewer Heather Phares said it "picks up more or less" where their debut album "left off, delivering plenty of revved-up, melodic punk-pop." Trombino's production "adds to the album's slightly dated, constrained sound." Jason Damas of PopMatters said the lyrics were "actually quite thoughtful", and considered the album "one of those sounds-happy-but-is-lyrically-downbeat records". Slant Magazine's Aaron Scott said the despite Saporta's voice having "previously combined snottiness with catchiness", the record displayed "melodies lacking both attitude and pop hooks." The band "shines on [the] slower tracks", however, "they aren’t bright enough to save the rest of the album."

== Track listing ==
All music written by Midtown. All lyrics written by Gabe Saporta, except "Perfect" and "Find Comfort in Yourself" by Hearth Saraceno, and "One Last Time" by Tyler Rann.

1. "Become What You Hate" – 2:50
2. "Still Trying" – 2:58
3. "Get It Together" – 3:28
4. "Like a Movie" – 3:32
5. "There's No Going Back" – 3:10
6. "Perfect" – 3:40
7. "You Should Know" – 2:39
8. "One Last Time" – 3:29
9. "A Faulty Foundation" – 2:43
10. "In the Songs" – 3:33
11. "Find Comfort in Yourself" – 2:41

Bonus tracks

12. "Make This Right" – 3:05
13. "Let Go (Remix)"

== Personnel ==
Personnel per booklet.

Midtown

- Gabe Saporta – lead vocals, bass
- Heath Saraceno – backing vocals, guitar
- Rob Hitt – drums, backing vocals
- Tyler Rann – backing vocals, guitar

Additional musician

- Vinnie Caruana – additional backing vocals (track 11)

Production

- Mark Trombino – producer, mixing, engineer, programming
- Justin Smith – engineer
- Pete Novak – assistant engineer
- Dave Ahlert – assistant engineer
- Brian Gardner – mastering
- Mike Bozzi – assistant
- Tim Stedman – art direction, design
- Justin Stephens – photography
- Marco Orozco – design

== Charts ==
Chart (2002)	Peak position
US Billboard 200	90
