= Sabi (American singer) =

American singer

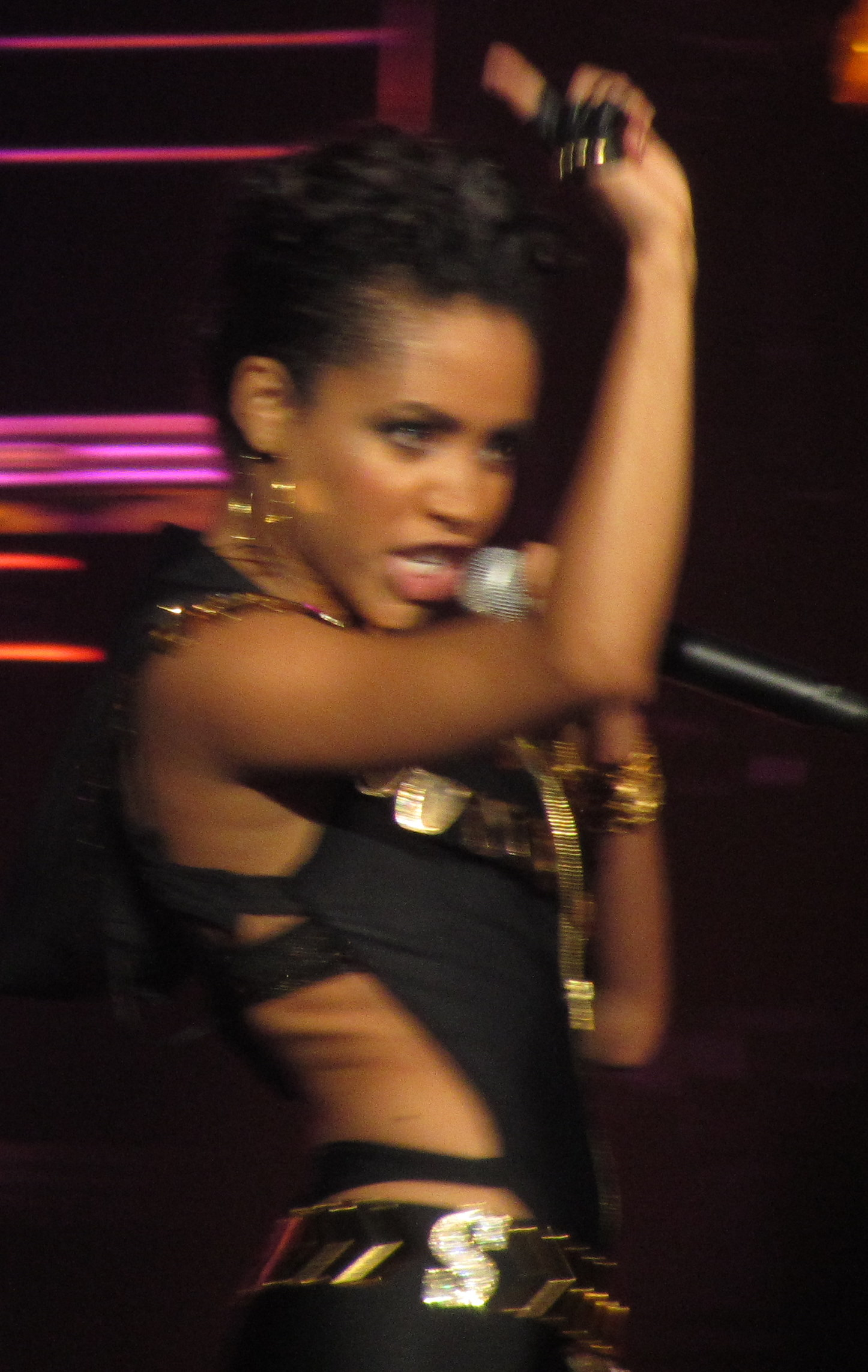
- Sabi on the Femme Fatale Tour in 2011

Background information
- Also known as: Sabi
- Born: Jenice Sabbion Portlock; November 24, 1987 (age 38); Inglewood, California, United States
- Genres: Pop; R&B; electropop; hip hop
- Occupations: Singer; songwriter; dancer
- Instruments: Vocals
- Years active: 2008–present
- Labels: Kemosabe; Warner Bros.
- Website: officialsabi.com

Jenice Sabbion Portlock (born November 24, 1987), also known as Sabi, is an American pop singer, songwriter, and dancer from Los Angeles, California. She is best known for her guest appearance on Cobra Starship's 2011 single, "You Make Me Feel...", which peaked at number seven on the Billboard Hot 100. Prior, she was part of the hip hop girl group the Bangz.

== Biography ==
=== Career beginnings ===
In 2008, Sabi appeared in an independent short film The Smallest River in Almirante, which was executive produced by actor Shia LaBeouf. She was cast in commercials for ABC Family, Universal Studios, and Pepsi.

=== 2009–10: The Bangz and group disbandment ===
During the summer of 2009, Sabi was approached by The Co-Stars, a production team who were looking to launch a female duo. They created an urban pop group called The Bangz with Sabi and Korttney Ann Elliott, known as Ella Ann. They were signed to the indie recording label VNR, Asylum Records, and Warner Bros. Records. They released two singles, "Boys With Tattoos (We Jerkin')" and "Found My Swag", which reached moderate success and airplay.

Shortly after the release of these singles, Ella Ann was seriously injured in a drive-by shooting; she was unable to continue as a part of The Bangz as a result.

Sabi shot a solo video and performed several times alone under The Bangz name, but ultimately the group could not continue without Ella Ann. The duo disbanded, but Warner Bros. chose to continue the label's relationship with Sabi as a solo artist.

=== 2011–present: Solo career ===
In April 2011, Sabi released the song "Goodnight" as a promotional single for her debut album. Also in 2011, Sabi was featured on the Britney Spears song "(Drop Dead) Beautiful" as well as the Cobra Starship single "You Make Me Feel...," the latter of which peaked at No. 7 on the U.S. Billboard Hot 100. She later accompanied Spears on Femme Fatale Tour and was featured on the tour's DVD release. She was also featured on the New Boyz song "Tough Kids" from the album Too Cool to Care.

Shortly after, she released the song "Wild Heart", produced by Cirkut, which was later recorded in Simlish for The Sims 3 video game. Her debut album, then titled All I Want, was to feature production from Benny Blanco, Klas of the Teddybears, Diplo, Ammo, The Cataracs and The Co-Stars and was due to be released via Dr. Luke's Kemosabe imprint and Warner Bros. Records. A video for "Wild Heart"' debuted on March 19, 2012. A new Dr. Luke and Cirkut-produced track "Where They Do That At?" featuring Wale premiered on Spotify in April 2012. The video for the song, directed by Tim Cruz, debuted on April 19, 2012, along with a behind-the-scenes video.

Sabi was also announced to be host of her own fashion web-series, which was titled Found My Swag after The Bangz's single. The series premiered on the YouTube channel "The Warner Sound" on November 1, 2012.

In November 2012, Sabi released the Jakob Owens-directed video another new single, titled "Champagne". The song was produced by Crack For Kids.

In August 2013, she released "Cali Love" featuring Tyga, the lead single from her mixtape 0–60: Love Sounds. Sabi released the song "Love Sounds", produced by Ryan McDermott, in November 2013 and announced that the mixtape would be released on November 13, 2013. On the eve of 0–60: Love Sounds's release, Sabi premiered a cover of Fleetwood Mac's 1977 single "Dreams", a track included on her mixtape. The entire 11-song mixtape was released for free download via the site HotNewHipHop.com.

After the release of the mixtape, Sabi parted ways with both Kemosabe and Warner Bros. Records and began recording music as an independent artist.

In 2017, Sabi released "The One", a promotional single made available exclusively via her SoundCloud account. Following three years of silence, she returned to music in February 2020 and released "Ready", produced by Malcolm D. McDaniel. Unlike "The One", the single was released to most major streaming platforms and digital download services via BlakBurd Ent. and Empire Distribution.

Later in 2020, she began hosting an Apple Music radio program titled, "Easy Hits Radio with Sabi", geared toward adult contemporary music.

== Discography ==
=== Mixtapes ===
0–60: Love Sounds
No.	Title	Producer(s)	Length
1.	"Intro"	Ryan McDermott	1:09
2.	"Cali Love" (featuring Tyga)	Mark J. Feist	3:37
3.	"Love Sounds"	McDermott	3:41
4.	"Better Than This"	Mark J. Feist	3:45
5.	"Hollywood Romance"	McDermott, The Arsenals (co.)	3:56
6.	"24K"	Jonas Jeberg	3:43
7.	"Both of Us" (featuring Ryan McDermott)	McDermott, Mike McTaggard (co.)	3:30
8.	"The Change"	The Costars	2:29
9.	"Body Language"	Mark J. Feist	2:34
10.	"Dreams"	McDermott	4:38
11.	"Cali Love" (Remix) (featuring Tyga)	McDermott	3:47

=== Singles ===
List of single
Title	Year	Album
"Wild Heart"	2011	N/A
"Where Do They Do That At?" (featuring Wale)	2012	N/A
"Champagne"	2012	N/A
"Cali Love" (feat Tyga)	2013	0 to 60: Love Sounds
"Glow"	2016	N/A
"Ready"	2020	N/A
"—" denotes a title that was not released or did not chart in that territory.

=== Promotional singles ===
- Goodnight (2011)
- The One (2017)

=== Featured singles ===
List of singles, with selected chart positions and certifications, showing year released and album name
Title	Year	Peak chart positions										Certifications	Album
Title	Year	US	AUS	CAN	FRA	GER	IRL	NLD	NZ	SWI	UK	Certifications	Album
"You Make Me Feel..." (Cobra Starship featuring Sabi)	2011	7	3	4	13	—	12	28	1	47	16	US: Platinum; CAN: Gold; AUS: Platinum; NZ: Platinum	Night Shades
"—" denotes items which were not released in that country or failed to chart.

=== Other appearances ===
Year	Song	Artist(s)	Album
2011	"(Drop Dead) Beautiful"	Britney Spears	Femme Fatale
2011	"Tough Kids"	New Boyz	Too Cool to Care
2012	"Barely Standing"	Diplo & Datsik	Express Yourself
2013	"Overflow"	Ryan McDermott	Ryan Vs. The Sandman: Tale of The Sleepwalkers
2015	"Firestarter"^{[a]}	Sandro Silva	Non-album single

- ^{a} Sabi's vocals are not officially credited on this release.

=== Music videos ===
Song	Year	Director
"Wild Heart"	2012	Mike Mahil
"Where They Do That At?" (feat. Wale)	2012	Tim Cruz
"Champagne"	2012	Jakob Owens
"Cali Love" (feat. Tyga)	2013	Mike Mahil

== See also ==
- List of Afro-Latinos
