= You Make Me Feel... =

2011 single by Cobra Starship

Single by Cobra Starship featuring Sabi

from the album Night Shades
- Released: May 10, 2011
- Genre: Dance-pop; electropop
- Length: 3:36
- Label: Fueled by Ramen; Decaydance; Warner Bros.
- Songwriters: Steve Mac; Ina Wroldsen
- Producer: Steve Mac

Cobra Starship singles chronology
"Hot Mess" (2009)	"You Make Me Feel..." (2011)	"Middle Finger" (2012)

Music video
- "You Make Me Feel..." on YouTube

"You Make Me Feel..." is a song by American synthpop band Cobra Starship with guest vocals by American pop singer Sabi. It was the first single released from their fourth studio album, Night Shades. The song was released digitally through iTunes on May 10, 2011. The song is a dance-pop, electropop song and it talks about looking for a soulmate in the club. The track received mixed reviews from most music critics; some thought that it was "catchy and happy", whereas others criticized it for being too "faceless and empty". Commercially, the song reached No. 1 in New Zealand and entered the top 10 in Australia, Canada, Hungary, Japan, and the United States.

== Background ==
After the success of the single "Good Girls Go Bad", which was their most successful single on the charts, Cobra Starship began to record what would be their fourth studio album. A clip of "You Make Me Feel..." was first posted online on May 6, 2011. It was released before the album finish and it served as the first single from the album, Night Shades. It was released on May 10, 2011, and features American pop singer and rapper Sabi. Sabi first came to many people's attention after she made a guest appearance on Britney Spears's song "(Drop Dead) Beautiful" from the album Femme Fatale. Explaining how the collaboration came about, Gabe Saporta said they were "looking for a good singer," and her name "came up through the network," ultimately leading to the two working together.

== Composition ==
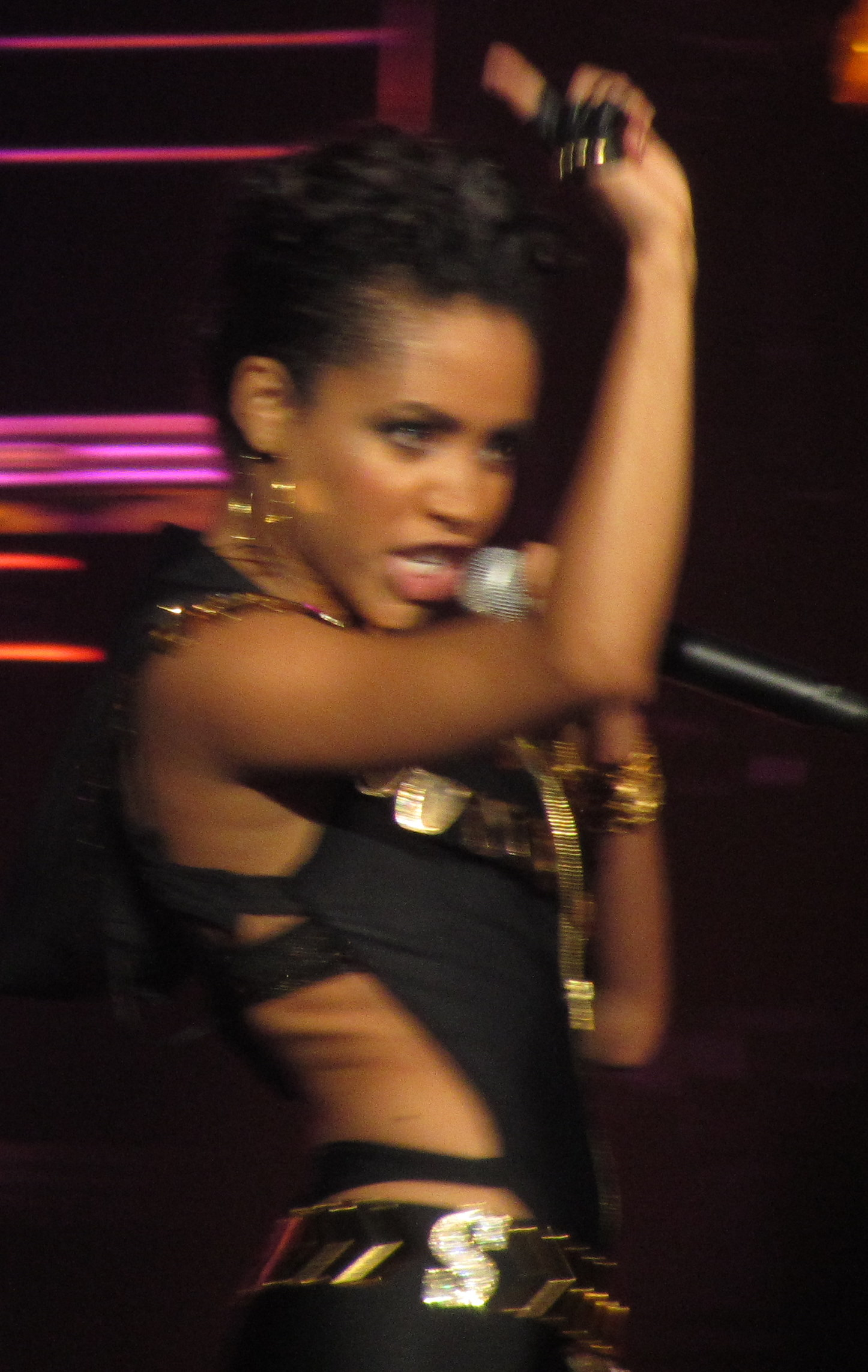
Singer Sabi is featured on the track.

"You Make Me Feel" was written by Steve Mac and Ina Wroldsen and produced by Mac. The song finds Gabe Saporta singing of looking for his soul mate.

"Obviously, some of my personal drama was about feeling alone, and feeling like I was searching the world for the right person". "And one of the things we want for this song and this record – even though it has personal stuff in it – is to be something everyone can relate to, and I think that the concept of people trying to find the right person is something that's universal."

The song is written in common time, maintaining a dance-beat tempo. It has a chord progression of Gm–Dm–B♭–E♭/B♭–F/C. The song is set in the key of B♭ major. Backed up by a simple beat and minimal synth arrangement, Saporta sings about finding the girl he has been missing: "Girl, I've been all over the world looking for you / I'm known for taking what I think I deserve, and you're overdue." Sabi, provides the chorus and the "la-la-la-la-la" melody that carries the song as Saporta sings "You make me feel so...", but never quite finishes the thought. MTV described the sound as "club-friendly," which Saporta said in response, "this song is a little easier to digest for the fans of ours that only knew 'Good Girls Go Bad'." In a separate interview with Alternative Press, he stated the group "tried to replicate" the sound of "Good Girls Go Bad" for "You Make Me Feel...". According to Monica Herrera, a writer from Rolling Stone, the song has a riff that suggests Pink's "Raise Your Glass".

== Critical reception ==
The song received mixed reviews from most contemporary music critics. Scott Shetler from PopCrush gave the song 8 out of 10 stars, and wrote that the song "is more understated than some of the group's previous work, but it feels like a potential summer hit." Bill Lamb, writer of About.com, gave to the song 3 stars out of 5, praising the "catchy hook" and the "upbeat, happy melody", but criticized the track, calling it a "bland hit factory pop" and "faceless". He ended up the review, stating that "it's certainly catchy, but it is all rather bland and empty as well." The Idolator Staff agreed, writing that "On the one hand, it's a totally serviceable dance track, and Sabi's vocals are much stronger here than in her weak, cringe-inducing rap on "(Drop Dead) Beautiful", but on the other hand, we've heard this synth hook before from other artists and frankly, it sounds like Cobra Starship may be trying too hard to keep up with the Euro dance trend while totally abandoning their old sound." Monica Herrera wrote for Rolling Stone that "Saporta drops weak pickup lines, but guest diva Sabi calls herself 'the baddest baby in the atmosphere,' and is right."

A positive review came from Alternative Press editor Aubrey Welbers, who wrote that the "catchy, calculated hit is a bona fide jam for lonely partygoers looking for dance floor romance." In most of the reviews from the album, including the Allmusic and Entertainment Weekly reviews, the song was picked as one of the album's best tracks. Megan Rozell from Blogcritics gave the song a positive review, writing that the song "allows for sing-along lyrics, beautiful words from Sabi, and pop sounds that allow the listener to let loose and dance."

== Chart performance ==
On July 4, 2011, the song debuted at No. 1 in New Zealand, becoming Cobra Starship's first chart-topper and second top-three single there, after "Good Girls Go Bad". The song also reached the top three in Australia, debuting at No. 31 on August 28 and climbing to No. 3 on October 2, staying on the chart for 21 weeks. In the United States, the song peaked at No. 7 on the Billboard Hot 100, becoming the band's highest-charting single alongside "Good Girls Go Bad" and their second top-10 single. It additionally peaking at No. 4 on Billboard's Mainstream Top 40 chart and No. 5 on its Hot Dance Airplay chart. The single has sold over 2,000,000 downloads in the US alone. In Canada, the song reached a peak of No. 4 on the Canadian Hot 100. In every aforementioned country, it went Platinum or multi-Platinum, receiving its highest certification in Australia and the US (3× Platinum).

In Europe, "You Make Me Feel..." debuted at No. 16 on the UK Singles Chart and No. 4 on the UK Dance Chart. It was slightly more popular in Scotland—peaking at No. 14 on the Scottish Singles Chart—and in Ireland, where it reached No. 12. In mainland Europe, the song reached the top 10 in Hungary, reaching No. 8, and charted within the top 20 in Belgium (Flanders and Wallonia), Finland, and France. It was a moderate chart hit in Denmark, the Netherlands, and Switzerland, reaching No. 40, No. 58, and No. 47, respectively. Elsewhere, the song charted at No. 21 in Brazil and No. 10 in Japan.

== Music video ==
Filmed in New York, the music video premiered on June 28, 2011, via MTV. The video's main theme is a "magic photobooth" that once it takes someone's picture, it tells how said person is feeling. The video features celebrity cameos including actor Robin Williams and his daughter Zelda Williams.

=== Background ===
Saporta explained to MTV News the concept of the music video:

"It's a song about a guy and a girl, and the concept is, at the beginning of the video, I find one of Sabi's photos, and she's feeling the same way that I'm feeling, which is incomplete without each other," he said. "We're sharing feelings, and that's what I realize, so I'm like, 'Wow, I want to find this girl.' So I look all over the world for her, and our world is the nightclub. The video is about the photo booth. It's just not any photo booth; it's a photo booth that tells you how you're really feeling. That's the main star of the video."

=== Synopsis ===
At the beginning of the music video, Gabe gets his picture taken in the photobooth, and when he is grabbing it, a picture of Sabi appears to be stuck in the slit. Both pictures' feelings read "Incomplete". Then Gabe makes his goal of the night to find the girl in the picture. While this is happening, Victoria Asher is seen dragging different people into the bathroom, these people including twins and a girl, hence her feeling being "kinky". Gabe goes around the club (his "world" as in girl I've been all over the world looking for you) trying to find Sabi and stumbling upon different people who embrace him in hugs or handshakes. Sabi is seen dancing around the club when her part of the song comes on. Nate Novarro instead of dancing, orders a burger through Vicky-T's iPad; his feeling being "munchy". During the video, all drinks get taken away from Ryland Blackinton, hence why on his picture he is feeling "thirsty". When Gabe finally finds Sabi, they give each other a look of sheer happiness, before they both enter the photobooth. The lights go off, and at the moment they go back on, Gabe and Sabi seem to be kissing. They take a new picture together, and it reads "Complete", thus ending the video.

The music video also includes cameos by lookalike DJs Andrew and Andrew, Brooklyn hip-hop duo Ninjasonik, photographer Nicky Digital, MTV News correspondent James Montgomery, Elle Magazine creative director Joe Zee, JustJared.com's own Jared Eng, Jersey Shore's The Situation, singer Wynter Gordon, actress Zelda Williams and her late father, comedian and actor Robin Williams.

== Promotional use ==
This song was used in the promotion for America's Next Top Model: All Stars. It was also used in various advertisements for the 13th season of Big Brother. It is also on the soundtrack of the 2012 film American Reunion. It was featured in the episode "Bride and Prejudice" (season 4, episode 21) of 90210. The song has recently been revealed to be on the on-disk soundtrack for the game Dance Central 3 and DLC on another dance game Just Dance 4, it formerly was a Cheetos exclusive for the latter. It is featured as a downloadable song on Rock Band 4.

== Live performances ==
On August 28, 2011, Cobra Starship performed "You Make Me Feel..." on the MTV Video Music Awards Pre-show with Sabi. Then on September 14, 2011, they performed "You Make Me Feel..." with Sabi and Team iLuminate on the America's Got Talent finale. In November, they went on Conan and Dancing with the Stars to perform "You Make Me Feel..." with Sabi.

== Charts ==
=== Weekly charts ===
Weekly chart performance for "You Make Me Feel..."
Chart (2011–2012)	Peak position
Australia (ARIA)	3
Belgium (Ultratop 50 Flanders)	19
Belgium (Ultratop 50 Wallonia)	14
Brazil (Brasil Hot 100)	21
Canada Hot 100 (Billboard)	4
Czech Republic Airplay (ČNS IFPI)	47
Denmark (Tracklisten)	40
Finland (Suomen virallinen lista)	14
France (SNEP)	13
Hungary (Rádiós Top 40)	8
Ireland (IRMA)	12
Japan Hot 100 (Billboard)	10
Lebanon (Lebanese Top 20)	17
Mexico Airplay (Billboard)	32
Netherlands (Dutch Top 40)	22
Netherlands (Single Top 100)	58
New Zealand (Recorded Music NZ)	1
Scottish Singles Sales (Official Charts)	14
Slovakia Airplay (ČNS IFPI)	42
Switzerland (Schweizer Hitparade)	47
UK Singles (Official Charts)	16
UK Dance (Official Charts)	4
US Billboard Hot 100	7
US Adult Contemporary (Billboard)	28
US Adult Pop Airplay (Billboard)	13
US Dance Airplay (Billboard)	5
US Hot Latin Songs (Billboard)	33
US Pop Airplay (Billboard)	4
US Rhythmic Airplay (Billboard)	17

=== Year-end charts ===
2011 year-end chart performance for "You Make Me Feel..."
Chart (2011)	Position
Australia (ARIA)	36
Brazil (Crowley)	99
Canada (Canadian Hot 100)	42
New Zealand (RIANZ)	21
US Billboard Hot 100	48
US Pop Songs (Billboard)	23

2012 year-end chart performance for "You Make Me Feel..."
Chart (2012)	Position
Brazil Airplay (Crowley)	89
Canada (Canadian Hot 100)	95
France (SNEP)	174
Hungary (Rádiós Top 40)	58

== Certifications ==
Certifications and sales for "You Make Me Feel..."
Region	Certification	Certified units/sales
Australia (ARIA)	3× Platinum	210,000^{^}
Canada (Music Canada)	2× Platinum	160,000^{*}
New Zealand (RMNZ)	2× Platinum	60,000^{‡}
United Kingdom (BPI)	Silver	200,000^{‡}
United States (RIAA)	3× Platinum	3,000,000^{‡}
Streaming
Denmark (IFPI Danmark)	Gold	450,000^{†}
^{*} Sales figures based on certification alone.^{^} Shipments figures based on certification alone.^{‡} Sales+streaming figures based on certification alone.^{†} Streaming-only figures based on certification alone.
