= Middle Finger (song) =

Single by Cobra Starship featuring Mac Miller

from the album Night Shades
- Released: January 3, 2012
- Recorded: 2011
- Genre: R&B; electropop; alternative rock; alternative hip hop
- Length: 3:33
- Label: Fueled by Ramen; Decaydance; Warner Bros.
- Songwriters: Cobra Starship; Tor Erik Hermansen; Mikkel S. Eriksen; Malcolm McCormick; Nate Walka
- Producer: Stargate

Cobra Starship singles chronology
"You Make Me Feel..." (2011)	"Middle Finger" (2012)	"1Nite (One Night)" (2012)

Mac Miller singles chronology
"Party on Fifth Ave." (2011)	"Middle Finger" (2012)	"Loud" (2012)

"Middle Finger" is a song by American synthpop band Cobra Starship. The track was written and produced by Norwegian production team Stargate and features Pittsburgh rapper Mac Miller. It was released as the third promotional single from their fourth studio album, "Night Shades" and later as the second official single.

== Background ==
After the success of the single "You Make Me Feel...", which was their most successful single on the charts, the band released three promotional singles, which were available exclusively through iTunes. The first was "1Nite" on July 26, the second was "Fool Like Me" on August 9 and the last one was "Middle Finger" on August 23. It later, became the second official single of the album on January 3, 2012, with a single containing two remixes, being released on the iTunes Store.

== Composition ==
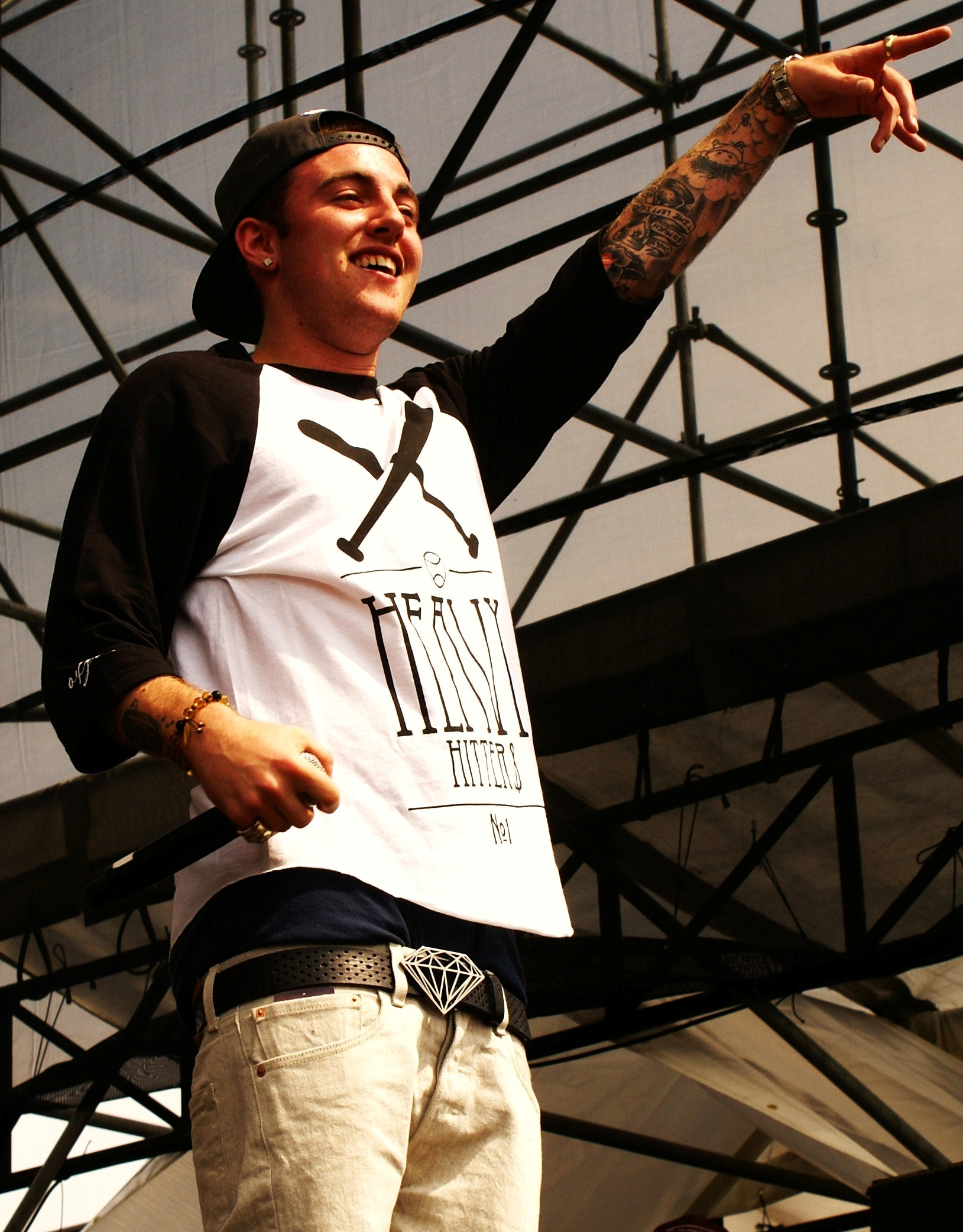
Rapper Mac Miller is featured on the track.

"Middle Finger" was written by Cobra Starship, Nate Walka, Mac Miller and co-written and produced by Stargate. "It's just like a fun song," Cobra Starship lead singer Gabe Saporta tells The BoomBox. Despite having the opportunity to add a more popular rapper to the track, produced by Norwegian production duo Stargate, Saporta chose to go with Miller because he was lesser known.

Saporta told to "BoomBox" about Miller collaboration:

"We worked on the track with Stargate and they're totally hooked up". "They had a big name rapper that they wanted to get on the track. My vibe was like, 'I feel like everyone has used the same big name rappers all the time,' and I just wanted to get someone who was fresh. I was already a Mac Miller fan. I heard 'Let 'Em In,' 'Knock, Knock.' I love [those] song[s], so thats why I wanted him on the record."

In another interview, Gabe told to MTV News about the collaboration:

"That's actually the first time I met him, when he was he came to do his rap for 'Middle Finger.' He was super chill, super laid-back, he wrote his stuff there in the studio. It was good vibes, man. It gives the song a totally different flavor," he added, "and we definitely did that consciously. Most pop songs right now are like straight-up bangers, so we wanted to do something that might stand out a little bit and be a little more down-tempo."

Lyrically, the song finds the boy trying to forget his former beau in a club and getting himself drunk. According to Gary Saporta, "the song is kind of like, fun, cheeky, screw-you-haters vibe." But as the lyrics describe, you really don't need to be irritated to point upward. In fact, in this song, it's an expression of happiness, perhaps after you've had a few drinks.

== Critical reception ==
The song received mixed reviews from most contemporary music critics. Megan Rozell from Blogcritics wrote that the song "surprise everyone by incorporating Mac Miller, a current rap sensation, but, makes it difficult to decipher the difference between the voices of Gabe Saporta and Miller." Becky Bain wrote for Idolator that "The song's otherwise happy-go-lucky verses and friendly club beats don't really gel with the act of angrily flipping the bird."

== Music video ==
The song's music video finds Cobra Starship helping old folks across the street and other assorted good deeds, only to end getting the finger themselves. Mac Miller couldn't make the shoot, and filmed his parts whilst on tour.

Saporta explained the clip's concept to MTV News:

"We definitely didn't want the video to be angsty; a lot of people hear the title 'Middle Finger' and they think it's a mean or angry song, it's not about that, it's about letting go and having fun... and I think that's the vibe we wanted to have with the video, so, we thought it would be funny if old ladies gave us the finger."

=== Storyline ===
Miller kicks off the kiss-off video, setting the tone for what's in store. He raps: "Got my middle finger up and it's pointed to the clouds / Rollin' in with my whole entourage, too many of us to count." The clip features each Cobra Starship member in various situations where their "I don't care" attitude causes store clerks, kids, an old lady and even a homeless guy to give them the bird. The band takes it all in stride, though, just as the song's chorus denotes: "Throw your cups in the air / We so fly / Middle finger up to the sky..."

== Track listing ==
iTunes remix single
No.	Title	Length
1.	"Middle Finger" (Bingo Players Remix)	5:25
2.	"Middle Finger" (Bingo Players Radio Mix)	3:35
Total length:		9:00

== Charts ==
Chart performance for "Middle Finger"
Chart (2011–2012)	Peak position
Canada Hot 100 (Billboard)	55
Japan Hot 100 (Billboard)	80
US Bubbling Under Hot 100 (Billboard)	14
US Pop Airplay (Billboard)	36
