= Save the World, Lose the Girl =

Studio album by Midtown
- Released: February 15, 2000
- Recorded: July 1999
- Studio: Doug Messenger, North Hollywood, California
- Genre: Pop punk; emo; power pop
- Length: 38:53
- Label: Drive-Thru
- Producer: Mark Trombino

Midtown chronology
The Sacrifice of Life EP (1999)	Save the World, Lose the Girl (2000)	Living Well Is the Best Revenge (2002)

Save the World, Lose the Girl is the debut studio album by American rock band Midtown. Forming in 1998, Midtown released The Sacrifice of Life EP in 1999, and was signed to Drive-Thru Records shortly afterwards. They went to California to record with producer Mark Trombino at Doug Messenger Studios in July of that year. Save the World, Lose the Girl was released on February 15, 2000, and was met with a positive reaction from music critics, who complimented the vocal harmonies. It was promoted with tour of the United States until June, when they took a break. A music video for "Just Rock and Roll" was posted online later in the month. They participated in that year's Warped Tour, before touring Japan and three further treks of the US. A European tour with the Donots occurred in early 2001, and was followed by two US tours, a second appearance on Warped Tour, and a support slot for Blink-182.

== Background and production ==
Midtown was formed in 1998 by vocalist/bassist Gabe Saporta, guitarist/vocalist Tyler Rann, and drummer Rob Hitt, all of whom attended Rutgers University together. Each member had been in a punk rock band previously: Hitt in Royalties, Rann in Nowhere Fast, and Saporta in an unnamed act, often playing shows with one another. Midtown wrote two songs over two weeks, before deciding to add guitarist/vocalist Heath Saraceno, who was friends with Rann, to the line-up. They released The Sacrifice of Life EP through independent label Pinball Records in April 1999. That same month, the band revealed they would be recording an album for independent label Drive-Thru Records later in the year. The band did pre-production and recorded with Heath Miller at Excess dB Studios in New Milford, Bergen County, New Jersey; he was assisted by Stuart Karmatz and Tom Petta, in a home studio.

The EP was supported with an east coast tour in June with One Cool Guy. Following its conclusion, they traveled to California in July to record with producer Mark Trombino, who was chosen after the band liked his work on Dude Ranch (1997) by Blink-182 and Clarity (1999) by Jimmy Eat World. Sessions were held at Doug Messenger Studios in North Hollywood. For their first week, they rehearsed material and altered the arrangements. Though recording was initially planned to finish in mid-July, it continued until the end of the month, lasting 20 days in total. Trombino mixed the recordings with the assistance of Annette Cisneros at Eldorado in Burbank, California. They were then mixed by Brad Vance at DNA Mastering in Studio City, California.

The album’s cover art and packaging prominently features a photograph of Disneyland’s Astro Orbitor attraction.

== Composition ==
Musically, Save the World, Lose the Girl has been described as pop punk, with elements of emo, drawing comparison to MxPx, Jawbreaker and the Ataris. All of the music was credited to the band, while Saporta wrote almost all of the lyrics with the exception: "Direction" (co-written with Rann), "Come On" (co-written with Hitt) and "Such a Person" (portion of lyrics from Russ Ballard). Rann said the title was influenced by the Spider-Man comics, where the titular hero has to renounce the affection of his partner in order to save the world.

The opening track, "Just Rock and Roll", was reminiscent of the Offspring, which was about Saporta being kicked out of his previous band, which he was in for five years. "Another Boy" is a short song, clocking in at 44 seconds; the lo-fi "No Place Feels Like Home" and "Come On" are both power ballads. "Such a Person" contains an interpolation of "God Gave Rock 'n' Roll to You" by Argent, written by Ballard.

== Release ==
Following the end of the recording sessions, the members finished their final semester of school in preparation for future touring. They finished the year playing two shows, one in November and the other in December. Preceding the album, the band went on tour in January 2000 with Fenix TX. A friend of the band had covered Hitt's role for a few months as he had issues with his parents, who wanted him to go to college. Save the World, Lose the Girl was released on Drive-Thru Records on February 15, 2000, which was promoted with a February–March tour with New Found Glory and Rx Bandits. They continued touring until June, when they took the month off. During the month, the music video for "Just Rock and Roll" was posted online, directed by Richard and Stephanie Reines. Following this, the band appeared at the July 8–12 dates of the 2000 Warped Tour, before going on a cross-country stint with the Stereo.

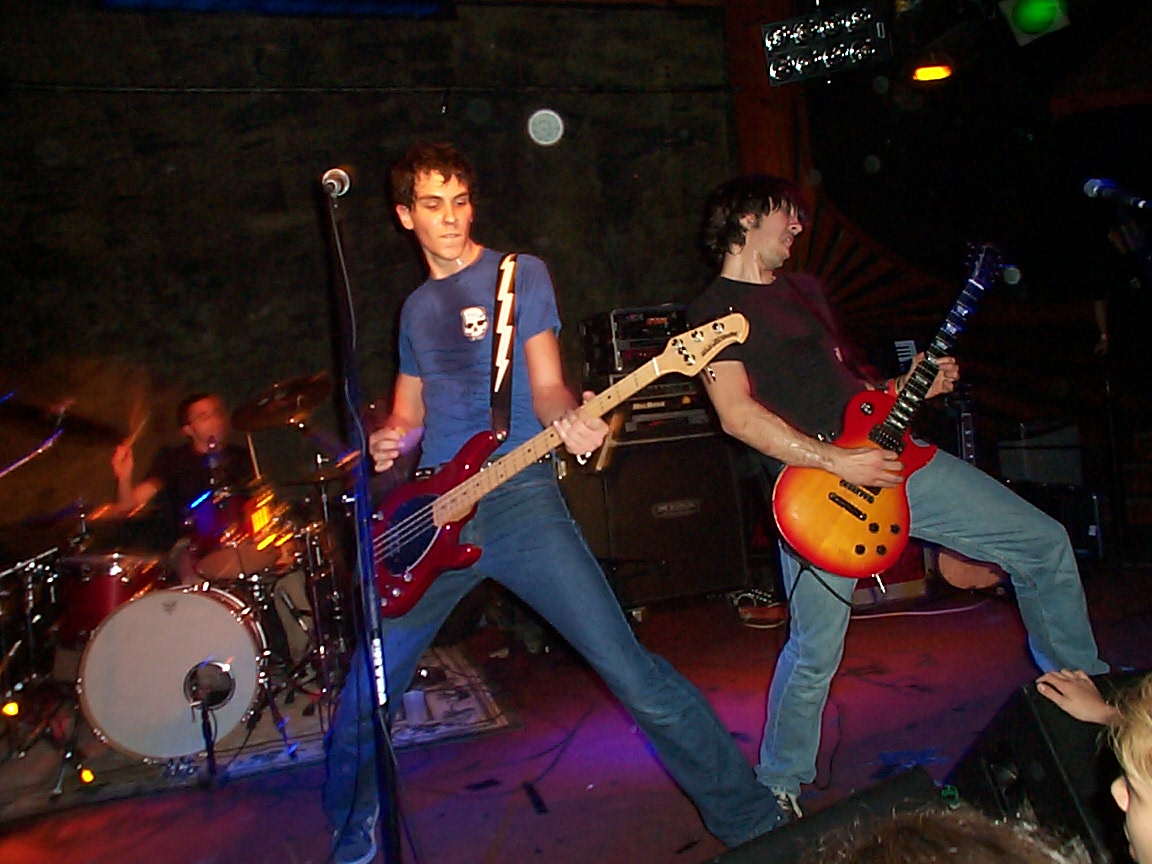
Midtown performing live in 2000.

In September, the group embarked on a Japanese tour with All. Around this time, the band signed to Burning Heart Records in Europe, who licensed the band's album from Drive-Thru for release in territory. Preceded by two shows in Hawaii, the band embarked on a full US tour between mid September and late October, with main support from Weston, Hot Rod Circuit, the Juliana Theory, Luckie Strike and Catch 22 appeared on select dates. In November, the band toured with Reel Big Fish and Catch 22; partway through the trek, the band were in a van accident, which resulted in their friend being seriously injured. They had a supporting slot for New Found Glory on their headlining tour in November and December. For this stint, they borrowed a van from their friends and were lent equipment from New Found Glory.

In early January 2001, the band performed three benefit shows for their friend that was injured. Between January and March, the band went on a European tour with the Donots. They returned to the US and went on a cross-country trek with Hot Rod Circuit in April and May. They were supported on select dates by River City High, Thursday, the Rocking Horse Winner and Thrice. In May, the group went on tour with H_{2}O and Autopilot Off. That same month, the band released a split EP with Millencolin, which featured "Let Go" alongside two new songs, "Get It Together" and "You Should Know". The group performed on the 2001 Warped Tour in July, before supporting Blink-182 in July and August. The band later supported Blink-182 for a few shows in September when Sum 41 (one of the other support acts) returned home.

== Reception ==
Professional ratings
Review scores
Source	Rating
AllMusic	3.5/5 stars
Kerrang!	2/5 stars
Metal Hammer	8/10
Rock Hard	7.5/10

Save the World, Lose the Girl received positive reviews from music critics. AllMusic reviewer Heather Phares said the "deft harmonies and shared lead vocals" offered the tracks "extra appeal." She viewed the release as a "strong debut ... reveal[ing] Midtown as an accomplished and surprisingly complex punk band."

Randy Flame of Ox-Fanzine liked the interplay between the guitars, aiding Saporta's vocals with "a warm, full sound [and] is particularly successful." CMJ New Music Report's Bill Konig saw it as an "unpretentious collection of emotionally-charged melodies" that were "fueled by tempestuous beats and dueling guitars." He complimented the "beautiful vocal harmonies", alongside "heartfelt" lyricism. Rock Hard said in spite of the "beautiful" harmonies, the release provided "a few pleasant corners, edges and melancholy tones" that make it "not necessarily risk-taking, but [a] thoroughly sympathetic album."

By April 2002, Save the World, Lose the Girl had sold 50,000 copies in the US. Rock Sound included the album at number 44 on their list of the most essential pop punk releases. Cleveland.com ranked "Just Rock and Roll" at number 98 on their list of the top 100 pop-punk songs.

== Track listing ==
All music by Midtown, all lyrics by Gabe Saporta, except where noted.

1. "Just Rock and Roll" – 3:08
2. "Direction" (Saporta, Tyler Rann) – 2:29
3. "Recluse" – 3:22
4. "Another Boy" – 0:44
5. "Let Go" – 2:55
6. "No Place Feels Like Home" – 4:27
7. "Such a Person" (Saporta, Russ Ballard) – 2:29
8. "We Bring Us Down" – 0:59
9. "Knew It All Along" – 2:36
10. "Come On" (Saporta, Rob Hitt) – 5:12
11. "Resting Sound" – 3:59
12. "Frayed Ends" (contains hidden track) – 6:27

== Personnel ==
Personnel per booklet.

Midtown

- Gabe Saporta – lead vocals, bass
- Heath Saraceno – backing vocals, guitar
- Rob Hitt – drums
- Tyler Rann – backing vocals, guitar

Production

- Mark Trombino – producer, recording, mixing
- Annette Cisneros – mix assistant
- Brad Vance – mastering
- Heath Miller – pre-production
- Stuart Karmatz – pre-production assistant
- Tom Petta – pre-production assistant
- Jack Bartolucci – title concept
- Yael Glick – photographs
- Jason Todd – photographs
- Gabe Saporta – art concept
