= Strangers (Goldie Boutilier song) =

Single by Goldie Boutilier

from the EP My Name Is Kay
- Released: July 4, 2012 (Canada)
- Recorded: 2011
- Genre: Pop; hip hop
- Length: 3:09
- Label: Dumptruck Unicorn Entertainment; Universal Music Canada
- Songwriters: Goldie Boutilier; Evan Bogart; Terrence Thorton; Noel Zancanella; Ryan Tedder
- Producer: Ryan Tedder

"Strangers" (also known as "Stranger") is a song by Canadian singer/songwriter Goldie Boutilier featuring guest vocals from American rapper Pusha T, released as the second single from Kay's self-titled debut EP, although she does not consider the track, or previous single "My Name Is Kay", as singles, but simply refers to them as "songs".

Boutilier explained that the meaning of the song is that feeling when "your boyfriend only loves you when you're alone", and lyrically the song talks about Kay's character going to a party, and being treated like a "stranger" by her love interest.

Inspiration for the song also came to her from watching re-runs of the late '80s, early '90s sitcom Perfect Strangers, featuring the characters Balki and Larry. She says: "Ryan and I were looking at pictures of them and I was saying how one of them looks like my dad. Then we started writing this hook, this kind of old school 'na na hooo.' It just came to us: 'Let's write it about perfect strangers.'"

== Critical reception ==
Critical reception of the track was mainly positive, however some criticized Pusha T's verses, and questioning the need for his vocals to be featured on the track. Liz Trinnear of MuchMusic praised the song, picking it as the best track on the EP, and compared Boutilier's lyrics to the likes of "Rye Rye meets Gwen Stefani". Homorazzi writer Tyrell highly praised the track, saying it "showcases what Kay does best - sing a catchy hook and tell an excellent story lyrically". Karen Bliss of MSN Entertainment also wrote a positive review of the track, however believed the song "Diddy Dum" should have received single status in its place.

== Music video ==
A lyric video for the song was released on Kay's official YouTube channel on July 4, 2012, the day the song was sent to radio stations in Canada.

The official music video for the track premiered on New.Music.Live on August 10, 2012, and almost two weeks later, on August 21, 2012, it was uploaded to Kay's official VEVO channel. It was shot in Etobicoke, Ontario, with interior shots of independent burger outlet Apache Burgers. Pusha T is entirely absent from the video and it centers on Boutilier at first being enamored with a love interest, a mannequin, but gets gradually fed up with his antics and perpetual infidelity. After repeatedly reconciling with the interest, Boutilier gets fed up for the last time, finds him at a party, drags him outside and smashes his head into pieces with a crowbar, then does a dance.

Boutilier explained that the concept of the video is that "everyone is treating her like a stranger", and all the people are "played" by mannequins. Originally, the mannequins were going to "come to life, like a fairytale" at the end of the video, but for unknown reasons these plans were changed. The license plate of the car used in the music video reads "BOSS2U".

== Live performances ==
Although Boutilier had been performing the song on her tour, "Strangers" had its Canadian television premiere on MuchMusic's live daytime program New.Music.Live., where she performed the song on stage by herself into a microphone made of plush tigers.

== Chart performance ==
"Strangers" peaked at #47 on the Canadian Hot 100 Chart.

Chart (2012)	Peak position
Canada (Canadian Hot 100)	47
