= Goldie Boutilier =

Canadian musician

- Also known as: Kay; My Name Is Kay; Goldilox
- Born: Kristin Kathleen Boutilier; July 31, 1985 (age 41); Sydney, Nova Scotia, Canada
- Genres: Pop; Synth-rock; Alt-Country; Rock; Disco
- Occupations: Singer-songwriter; model; DJ
- Instruments: Vocals; piano
- Labels: Interscope; Last Gang; Universal; Sony
- Website: goldieenterprises.com

Goldie Boutilier (born Kristin Kathleen Boutilier, July 31, 1985) is a Canadian singer, songwriter, model and DJ. She has released three studio albums and six EPs.

Born and raised in Reserve Mines, Nova Scotia, Boutilier moved to Los Angeles at the age of 20 to pursue a music career. After being discovered by OneRepublic member Ryan Tedder, Boutilier signed a recording contract with Interscope under the alias My Name Is Kay and released her self‑titled debut EP in 2011. Her name was shortened to just Kay and, following a string of successful features with Tiësto and Steve Aoki, she released her debut album My Name Is Kay in 2013.

After dealing with tensions with her label, Boutilier parted ways with Universal sometime in 2015. Boutilier then moved to Paris, France, and began DJing under the name Goldilox. She released her second album, Very Best, independently in 2018 using her new name. Then, in 2020, she changed her stage name again, to Goldie Boutilier.

Boutilier is a successful model, appearing in campaigns for Diesel Black Gold, H&M, John Galliano, Casablanca and Luisaviaroma. She is currently represented by VIVA Model Management in Europe.

== Career ==
=== 2011–2015: Career beginnings and My Name is Kay ===
In 2011, Boutilier was signed to Interscope Records under the moniker My Name Is Kay. She released her debut single "My Name Is Kay" on April 2, 2011. The song was moderately successful, charting on the Canadian Hot 100, debuting at No. 80, and peaking at No. 63. An EP of the same name was released on December 20, 2011, but was soon pulled from iTunes after Interscope shortened Boutilier's moniker to Kay. It was rereleased on February 28, 2012. The EP featured appearances from Pusha T and Kurtis Blow on the songs "Strangers" and "Going Diamond" respectively, as well as song writing credits from the likes of Ryan Tedder (of OneRepublic), Grammy award-winning songwriter Evan Bogart, Cherry Cherry Boom Boom, and producer Doctor Rosen Rosen. The EP received mixed reviews, comparing Boutilier to the likes of Katy Perry, Nicki Minaj, and Gwen Stefani. On July 17, 2012, Boutilier issued an apology for anti-anxiety medication/alcohol intoxicated erratic behavior and issuing obscene statements with young children present while performing at The Savoy Theatre in Glace Bay, Nova Scotia on July 11, with the statement of; "I want to apologize to my family and friends that came out to supoort my show... From my heart I am deeply sorry..."

On November 13, 2012 Boutilier released her second EP, Say What You Want. The EP featured the single "Rewind The Track" which was released a week prior. In a November 2012 interview with Idolator, Boutilier described the song with, "It reflects a time and place in my life that I both cherish and feel emotional towards. It's a special song for me".

Boutilier released her debut album, My Name Is Kay, on October 22, 2013. It was preceded by the singles "Whatever", "Next To You", and "Alive". The album received mixed reviews, being called "forgettable."

For the next two years Boutilier fought to be let out of her contracts with Interscope and Universal. Due to her legal fees, she began working at a restaurant to support herself. Boutilier ended up being able to get out of her contract, but was barred from using the name Kay. In an interview with Venice Magazine Boutilier stated: "I couldn't use that name anymore. So I said, 'Fine, keep it. I don't know what you're going do with it,'".

=== 2016–2018: Skin and Very Best ===
Boutilier re-emerged under the moniker Goldilox in 2015, where she began DJing and modeling in Paris, France. She soon signed a recording contract with Sony Music imprint, Insanity Records. She released her EP Skin on September 16, 2016. The EP was produced by Guillaume Doubet and Dan Farber, the former becoming a longstanding collaborator for Boutilier.

On February 20, 2018, Boutilier released "Michael's Song" under Room 108 Productions. It marked her first release as an independent artist. Singles "Ketamine", "Decision", and "Touch You Where It Hurts" followed soon after in the next couples months, all produced by Guillaume Doubet.

Boutilier posed nude for French edition Playboy magazine and featured on the cover of its September 2018 issue.

Her second album, Very Best, was released July 31, 2018. It contains seven songs including the single "I Love You", which was released on June 29, 2018. The album is inspired by Boutilier's love for disco music. In an interview with Ladygunn Magazine, Boutilier stated: "I remember seeing this book about Studio 54. When I opened the book, I saw all these pictures of people having fun, dancing, laughing, drinking with champagne, hanging with people I wish I could have met. Bianca Jagger riding into the club on a white horse…I wanted to capture that energy."

=== 2019–2024: Cowboy Gangster Politician, Emerald Year, and The Actress ===
Work on Boutilier's third album, originally titled Goldcity, began in 2019. In an interview with Schön! Magazine, Boutilier talked about the new album saying: "It was my intention to do more of a timeless album. I did a lot of digging through my parents' records. This is the first time I've worked with a producer that plays real instruments. I highly recommend doing this if you can't find "your sound"." In the same interview she revealed her legal name was changed to Goldie Boutilier, and that she also decided to change her stage name to her real name, stating that the 'lox' in Goldilox "felt juvenile".

On August 25, 2022, Boutilier released "He Thinks That I'm an Angel", her first single in over four years, and her first official release under the name Goldie Boutilier. She released the four-song EP Cowboy Gangster Politician on November 3, 2022. Another EP, the six-song Emerald Year was released November 9, 2023. On September 27, 2024, she released another six-song EP titled The Actress.

=== 2025–present: Goldie Boutilier Presents... Goldie Montana ===
Boutilier announced on her birthday via social media that her third album, Goldie Boutilier Presents... Goldie Montana, would be released on September 5, 2025. It was preceded by the singles "King of Possibilities", "Neon Nuptials", "I Can't", and "Goldie Montana". Boutilier also toured the album, opening for Orville Peck and playing some headlining shows and festivals in Europe throughout the year. To promote her new album, Boutilier embarked on the King of Possibilities tour in January 2026.

She received a Juno Award nomination for Breakthrough Artist or Group of the Year at the Juno Awards of 2026.

== Discography ==
=== LP ===
Title	Details	Peak chart positions
Title	Details	JPN
My Name Is Kay (Credited as Kay)	Released: October 22, 2013; Label: Universal, Dumptruck Unicorn Entertainment; Format: CD, digital download, streaming; Track listing: 1. "My Name Is Kay"; 2. "Next To You"; 3. "Bus Stop" (featuring Ryan Tedder); 4. "The Thrill" (featuring Tai Jason Patient); 5. "Strangers" (featuring Pusha T); 6. "It's Over"; 7. "Because Of You"; 8. "Alive"; 9. "Whatever"; 10. "I Ain't Gonna Cry"; 11. "Going Diamond" (featuring Kurtis Blow); 12. "Diddy Dum"	266
Very Best (Credited as Goldilox)	Released: July 31, 2018; Label: Room 108; Format: Digital download, streaming; Track listing: 1. "Ouverture"; 2. "I Love You"; 3. "Sex Paranoia"; 4. "Complimentary Drinks"; 5. "Candy Girl"; 6. "Very Best"; 7. "At the Moon"	—
Goldie Boutilier Presents... Goldie Montana	Released: September 5, 2025; Label: Goldie M&E Enterprises; Format: LP, digital download, streaming; Track listing: 1. "King of Possibilities"; 2. "Neon Nuptials"; 3. "Snake Eyes"; 4. "I Can't"; 5. "Favorite Fear"; 6. "Yacht is Sinking (Interlude)"; 7. "Who Are You Gonna Worship Now?"; 8. "I Am the Rich Man"; 9. "Goldie Montana"; 10. "Terrible Things"; 11. "At the End of the War"	—

=== EPs ===
Title	Details
My Name Is Kay (Credited as My Name Is Kay and Kay)	Released: February 28, 2012; Label: Universal, Interscope; Format: CD, digital download, streaming; Track listing: 1. "My Name Is Kay"; 2. "M.A.J.O.R."; 3. "Going Diamond" (featuring Kurtis Blow); 4. "Diddy Dum"; 5. "Strangers" (featuring Pusha T)
Say What You Want (Credited as Kay)	Released: November 13, 2012; Label: Universal, Last Gang Records; Format: CD, digital download, streaming; Track listing: 1. "Say What You Want"; 2. "Rewind the Track" (featuring TAI); 3. "Hot"; 4. "Rewind the Track" (featuring D-Why)
Skin (Credited as Goldilox)	Released: September 16, 2016; Label: Insanity Records, Sony Music Entertainment; Format: Digital download, streaming; Track listing: 1. "100%"; 2. "Morning"; 3. "I Know"; 4. "Crazy"; 5. "Obsessions"
Cowboy Gangster Politician	Released: November 3, 2022; Label: Goldie M&E Enterprises; Format: LP, digital download, streaming; Track listing: 1. "He Thinks That I'm an Angel"; 2. "Cowboy Gangster Politician"; 3. "K-Town"; 4. "Body Heat"
Emerald Year	Released: November 9, 2023; Label: Goldie M&E Enterprises; Format: LP, digital download, streaming; Track listing: 1. "Pretending"; 2. "Penthouse in The Sky"; 3. "Psycho"; 4. "White Limo Stuck in The Snow"; 5. "Good Ol Days"; 6. "Emerald Year"
The Actress	Released: September 27, 2024; Label: Goldie M&E Enterprises; Format: LP, digital download, streaming; Track listing: 1. "The Rhinestone Ceiling"; 2. "The Actress"; 3. "The Lineup"; 4. "The Ways I Punish Myself"; 5. "The Last Dance"; 6. "The Angel And The Saint"

=== Singles ===
Title	Year	Peak chart positions			Album
Title	Year	CAN	JPN	JPN Air	Album
"My Name Is Kay"	2011	63	—	—	My Name Is Kay EP
"Strangers" (featuring Pusha T)	2012	47	—	—	My Name Is Kay EP
"Whatever"	2013	—	—	—	My Name Is Kay
"Next To You"	2013	—	6	2	My Name Is Kay
"Summer Night In July" (Robbie Rivera & Kay)	2013	—	—	—	Non-album single
"Alive"	2013	—	—	—	My Name Is Kay
''Morning''	2016	—	—	—	Skin
''I Know''	2017	—	—	—	Skin
"Michael's Song"	2018	—	—	—	Non-album singles
"Ketamine"	2018	—	—	—	Non-album singles
"Decision"	2018	—	—	—	Non-album singles
"Touch You Where It Hurts"	2018	—	—	—	Non-album singles
"I Love You"	2018	—	—	—	Very Best
"He Thinks That I'm An Angel" (solo or with Chilly Gonzales)	2022	—	—	—	Cowboy Gangster Politician
"Cowboy Gangster Politician"	2022	—	—	—	Cowboy Gangster Politician
"K-Town"	2022	—	—	—	Cowboy Gangster Politician
"Pretending"	2023	—	—	—	Emerald Year
"Psycho"	2023	—	—	—	Emerald Year
"Good Ol Days"	2023	—	—	—	Emerald Year
"White Limo Stuck In The Snow"	2023	—	—	—	Emerald Year
"The Actress"	2024	—	—	—	The Actress
"The Angel And The Saint"	2024	—	—	—	The Actress
"The Lineup"	2024	—	—	—	The Actress
"King Of Possibilities"	2025	—	—	—	Goldie Boutilier Presents... Goldie Montana
"Neon Nuptials"	2025	—	—	—	Goldie Boutilier Presents... Goldie Montana
"I Can't"	2025	—	—	—	Goldie Boutilier Presents... Goldie Montana
"Goldie Montana"	2025	—	—	—	Goldie Boutilier Presents... Goldie Montana
"Party"	2026	—	—	—	TBA
"How To Be A Lover"	2026	—	—	—	TBA
"Infinite Love"	2026	—	—	—	TBA
"The Alligator"	2026	—	—	—	TBA

=== Promotional singles ===
Title	Year	Album
"Diddy Dum"	2012	My Name Is Kay - EP
"100%"	2016	Skin

=== As featured artist ===
Title	Year	Album
"Pick Your Poison" (Diplo & Datsik featuring Kay)	2011	Non-album single
"Work Hard, Play Hard" (Tiësto featuring Kay)	2011	Non-album single
"#1Nite (One Night)" (Cobra Starship featuring My Name Is Kay)	2012	Non-album single
"Singularity" (Steve Aoki & Angger Dimas featuring My Name Is Kay)	2013	Ultra Music Festival 2013
"Back Off, Bitch!" (Static Revenger featuring Kay)	2013	Non-album single
"More Than One" (Brass Knuckles featuring Kay)	2013	Brass Knuckles EP
"One Last Time" (Sam i featuring Goldilox)	2018	Random Shit From The Internet Era
"Burning House" (Peter and the Roses featuring Goldie Boutilier)	2023	TBA

=== Guest appearances ===
List of non-single guest appearances, with other performing artists, showing year released and album name
Title	Year	Other artist(s)	Album
"#StupidFacedd" (Whitegirl Wasted Remix)	2011	Wallpaper.	Non-album single
"Control Freak"	2012	Steve Aoki & Blaqstarr	Wonderland
"Flossy"	2012	Far East Movement	Dirty Bass
"This Is The Life"	2012	none	Step Up Revolution (Music from the Motion Picture)
"Right Round"	2012	The Treblemakers	Pitch Perfect: Original Motion Picture Soundtrack
"Burning Bridges"	2016	Devoted	Record Record Presents Filet Mignon 4

=== Music videos ===
Title	Year	Director
"M.A.J.O.R."	2011	Hill Kourkoutis
"My Name Is Kay"	2011	David Turvey
"Diddy Dum"	2012	Mista Hindz
"Strangers"	2012	Randall Thorne
"Rewind The Track"	2012	Luis Ramos
"Whatever"	2013	Aaron A
"Next To You"	2013	Ramos Valencia
"Alive"	2013	Aaron A
"Morning"	2016	Guillaume Doubet
"100%"	2016	Guillaume Doubet
"I Know"	2016	—
"Michael's Song"	2018	Wynn Holmes & Guillaume Doubet
"Touch You Where It Hurts"	2018	Guillaume Doubet
"I Love You"	2018	Guillaume Doubet
"Sex Paranoia"	2018	Guillaume Doubet
"Cowboy Gangster Politician"	2022	Goldie Boutilier & Guillaume Doubet
"Good Ol Days"	2023	Goldie Boutilier & Moosecanfly
"Favorite Fear"	2025	Chevy Tyler & Greg Swales

== Tours ==
=== Headlining ===
- Goldie Boutilier North American Tour (2024)
- Goldie Boutilier King of Possibilities Tour (2026)

=== Supporting ===
- The Cherrytree Pop Alternative Tour (2011)
- Hedley – Shipwrecked Tour (2012)
- LMFAO – Sorry For Party Rocking Tour (2012)
- Orville Peck – Stampede Tour (2024)
- Katy Perry – The Lifetimes Tour (2025)
- Lord Huron - The Cosmic Selector Tour (2026)
