= Gabe Saporta =

American musician and entrepreneur

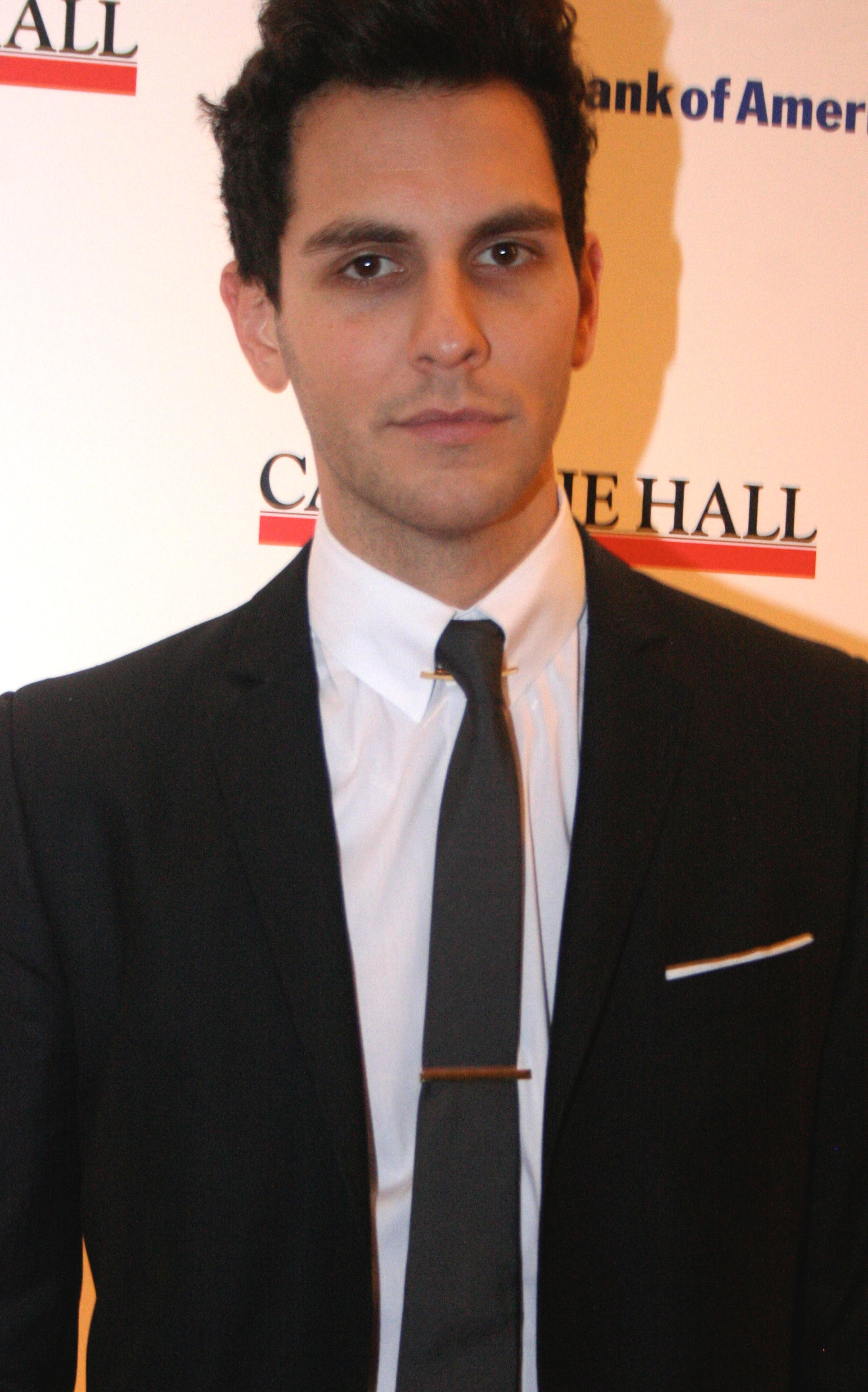
- Saporta in 2011

Background information
- Born: Gabriel Eduardo Saporta; October 11, 1979 (age 46); Montevideo, Uruguay
- Origin: New York City, New York, U.S.
- Genres: Synth-pop; alternative dance; electropunk; dance-pop; pop punk; punk rock; alternative rock; emo
- Instruments: Vocals; bass guitar
- Years active: 1998–present
- Labels: Decaydance; Fueled by Ramen; Drive-Thru; MCA; Columbia
- Member of: Midtown; Cobra Starship
- Formerly of: Humble Beginnings
- Website: gabesaporta.com

Gabriel Eduardo Saporta (born October 11, 1979) is an American musician and entrepreneur. From 2005 until 2015, and again since 2024, he is the lead vocalist and founder of the dance rock band Cobra Starship. On November 10, 2015, after nearly ten years and two Billboard Hot 100 top 10 hits, Saporta announced that the band would stop its work, and that he would be focusing on helping other musicians through his new venture, The Artist Group. Prior to Cobra Starship, Saporta had been the lead singer, bassist, and lyricist for the punk band Midtown.

== Early life ==
Gabe Saporta was born on October 11, 1979, in Montevideo to a Uruguayan Jewish family. He is of both Sephardic and Ashkenazi descent. His grandparents and great-grandparents escaped Europe during World War II and settled in Uruguay.

When he was four years old, he moved with his parents to New York City. They later moved to New Jersey in 1991. At an early age, Saporta developed a passion for music, which became his escape and salvation from a tumultuous upbringing. Saporta fell in love with music because of its ability to deliver messages and connect people. His first love was hip hop, but soon after he discovered punk rock and started going to shows to see bands such as Gorilla Biscuits, Fugazi, and Pavement, it was not long before Saporta, along with his brother Ricky, started to put on his own shows and put out his own records.

== Career ==
=== Career beginnings and Midtown (1998–2005) ===
When he was 16 years old, Saporta "joined his first band-- the appropriately titled Humble Beginnings" as a bass player. While in college at Rutgers University, he started the pop punk band Midtown. As the vocalist, lyricist, and bassist in Midtown, Saporta attracted widespread attention. The group released one EP and three LP albums: The Sacrifice of Life, Save the World, Lose the Girl, Living Well Is the Best Revenge and Forget What You Know, respectively.

Midtown encountered legal troubles with its first label after releasing its second album. It was during this time that Saporta who "was quite the businessman" decided he wanted to understand the music business from the other side and started managing a band named Armor For Sleep. As Armor For Sleep became successful, Saporta made a deal to merge his fledgling company into Crush Management, who would also manage Midtown. Crush later went on to launch Cobra Starship with Saporta.

After disbanding, Midtown developed a cult-like following. In response to this renewed interest, Midtown reunited for a secret show in Brooklyn and to headline the Skate & Surf Festival in Asbury Park, NJ in 2014. In 2022, Midtown announced several dates in support of My Chemical Romance in the fall of that year, alongside two headlining shows at the Starland Ballroom.

=== Cobra Starship (2006–2015) ===
After Midtown, Gabe Saporta wanted to start a project that was more light-hearted and whose music could incorporate diverse electronic influences. The idea for Cobra Starship came to him during a trip in the Arizona desert in 2005. Saporta produced and recorded the first Cobra album by himself with S*A*M & Sluggo. An early helpful development for Cobra Starship was when Midtown's management company set Saporta up with an opportunity to record a song for the soundtrack to the 2006 action film Snakes on a Plane, which became a minor hit.

By 2007, Cobra Starship was a full band and started touring the country. Cobra's eclectic sound allowed them to tour with acts as diverse as 30 Seconds to Mars, Fall Out Boy, and Travie McCoy. They also performed with many electronic acts such as Girl Talk and Kaskade.

From 2006 to 2014, Cobra Starship released four full-length albums, and scored two double-platinum Top 10 hits ("Good Girls Go Bad" and "You Make Me Feel"), as well as one gold record for "Hot Mess". Their single "Good Girls Go Bad" features guest vocals by Leighton Meester. Coincidentally, Saporta made his acting debut a few years later in the season 5 finale of Gossip Girl.

In 2012, Cobra Starship was the main support for Justin Bieber on his entire South American stadium tour.

=== T∆G // The Artist Group (2015–present) ===
On his Beats1 Radio show in November 2015, Gabe Saporta announced that he would no longer be performing or putting out new music. Saporta and business associate Mike Carden have announced the formation of a talent management firm, T∆G // The Artist Group, which is expected to commence operations in the first quarter of 2016. Saporta has explained that now he wants to work behind the scenes and help younger artists see their dreams come true.

In 2022, Gabe Saporta joined beatBread's Artist Advocacy Council, which provides "critical advice" to the independent music funding platform. Saporta joins Mike Caren (Artist Partner Group), Dave Dederer (founding member of The Presidents of the United States of America), Diana Rodriguez (Criteria Entertainment), Kei Henderson (Third & Hayden), Ray Daniels (Raydar, LLC), and Nick Jarjour (Hipgnosis).

=== Other work ===
On June 5, 2010, MTV aired an episode of When I Was 17, which focused on Gabe Saporta and discussed his life as a teenager. Saporta has hosted and been a correspondent for various music-related TV shows including being a presenter at the VMAs, a US correspondent for The EMAs and BBC1, and hosting several countdown shows on Fuse.

In March 2013, Gabe Saporta was featured on "Make It Out This Town", the first single by American rapper Eve's fourth album Lip Lock. In 2015, Saporta started working with Beats1 Radio as on-air talent and show host.

Beyond music, Saporta's other ventures include restaurants, real estate, and fashion.

== Personal life ==
Saporta's father, Diego Saporta, studied medicine and became a physician in Montevideo. Disenchanted with the then-ineffective health care system in Uruguay, among other reasons, the elder Saporta elected to leave the country with his family in the early 1980s. As a result, he undertook his medical training for a second time in the United States. Gabe Saporta has described his father's perseverance as an inspiration.

Saporta attended Rutgers University, where he majored in philosophy and political science.

In May 2013, Saporta and Erin Fetherston got married. In March 2016, the couple welcomed their first child, a son.

== Guest vocals ==
Gabe Saporta was featured on the songs:

| Song | Artist | Year | Notes |
|---|---|---|---|
| "Up Song" | Donots | 2002 | Saporta along with the rest of Midtown sing gang vocals |
| "What a Catch, Donnie" | Fall Out Boy | 2008 | Cameo appearance; sings the chorus "Grand Theft Autumn/Where Is Your Boy" at the end of the song. |
| "Crowded Room" | The Academy Is... | 2008 | Saporta is part of the yelling in the beginning of the song |
| "Hey There Ophelia" | MC Lars | 2009 | |
| "T.I.N.A." | Stunnaman | 2009 | |
| "Shut Your Mouth" | Cisco Adler | 2010 | |
| "What Happens on the Dancefloor" | Alexandra Burke | 2010 | |
| "Make It Out This Town" | Eve | 2013 | |

== See also ==
- Scene (subculture)
