= Kiha & The Faces (album) =

Kiha & The Faces (장기하와 얼굴들)

Studio album by Kiha & The Faces
- Released: June 9, 2011
- Genres: Pop rock, psychedelic rock
- Length: 44:34
- Labels: BGBG Records, DooRooDooRoo Artist Company

Kiha & The Faces chronology
Living the Carefree Life (별일 없이 산다) (2009)	Kiha & The Faces (장기하와 얼굴들) (2011)	Human Mind (사람의 마음) (2014)

Kiha & The Faces(장기하와 얼굴들) is the second studio album by South Korean rock band Kiha & The Faces. The album was released on June 9, 2011, through BGBG Records. Through this album, Kiha & The Faces won Best Rock Album, Best Rock Song, Album of the Year, and Musician of the Year at the 2012 Korean Music Awards.

== Background ==
After the success of their debut album Living the Carefree Life(별일 없이 산다) released in 2009, Kiha & The Faces said in an interview with YTN that their second album which was released in two and a half years, also focused on reconstructing the feeling of the 60s and 70s, just like the first album. The band released two music videos before the album's release: I Watched TV (TV를 봤네) and A Sort of Relationship (그렇고 그런 사이), and Chang Kiha directed the video.

From November 24 to 29, 2009, the band produced and performed a drama concert titled Have Things Really Been Uneventful?. Following the final performance in Jeju, the band concluded promotions for their first album and began preparations for their second studio album.

In a 2009 interview, Kiha stated that the band had performed "over 100 times," and expressed his intention to take time for himself in 2010. According to reports, he took a break during the first half of that year before resuming work on the new album.

On March 1, 2010, Kiha, representing the band, attended the Korean's People Music Awards, where the song "The Moon Is Rising, Let’s Go(달이 차오른다, 가자)" won in the independent music category. He stated that the band was currently preparing their second album while other members were engaged in separate activities, adding confidence that they would "return soon with great music."

In October 2010, Kiha posted a message on the fan club website apologizing for the delay in the album's release, stating that the final result would likely be released the following year. He also announced the departure of members of Mimi Sisters and explained that the band had been reorganized with the addition of keyboardist Lee Jong-min of Kingston Rudieska and guitarist Hasegawa Yohei of Kim Chang-wan Band.

In January 2011, member Jung Joong-Yeop mentioned in an interview that the new album was expected to be released around April that year. Around the same period, Kiha declined an invitation from producer Kim Tae-ho to participate in the "West Coast Highway Song Festival(서해안 고속도로 가요제)" project, reportedly stating that he did not want the success of the album to be attributed to the television program Infinite Challenge. In another interview, he added that the release schedule overlapped with the new album and he was concerned that the second album might be overshadowed.

== Recording ==
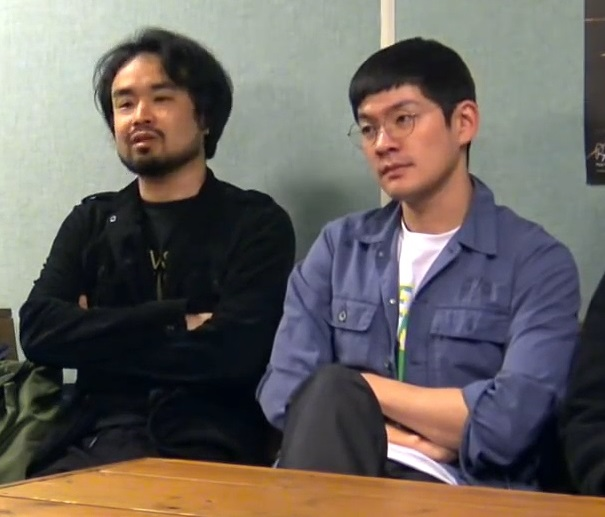
Producer Yohei Hasegawa(left) and Chang Kiha (right).

Recording began in earnest in late November 2010 after preliminary work had been completed, with more than half of the songs already composed and arranged following prior preparations for performances in Japan.

Production was handled by Kiha and Yohei, while all members participated in arranging the tracks. Recording and mixing were carried out by engineer Koh Hyun-jung at Seoul Studio and Dream Factory, respectively. The mixing process was conducted with all band members present. Mastering was completed by Choi Hoon of Sonic Korea, while Na Zaeum-soo, who had worked as recording and mixing engineer on the first album, served as sound supervisor.

Unlike their debut album Cheap Coffee, the band aimed for a more live-oriented sound by recording the music as a full-band performance rather than recording instruments separately and mixing them afterward. The album title Chang Kiha and the Faces was chosen to signify a "new beginning as a band."

Kiha later stated that the revenue from the first album was considered an investment from fans, which allowed the band to upgrade their equipment, rent better studios, and hire more experienced engineers. He emphasized that while the production was improved, the album was not excessively expensive, describing it as a "moderate level of investment."

Keyboardist Lee Jong-min performed on tracks such as "TV를 봤네," “보고 싶은 사람도 없는데," and "뭘 그렇게 놀래," using a variety of instruments including piano, organ, Moog, Mellotron, and Clavinet. On "뭘 그렇게 놀래," he used a Clavinet processed through a guitar wah pedal.

Kiha and Joong-yeop stated that they paid greater attention to sound detail, believing that "details create quality." They used imported amplifiers from the United States and guitars such as Gibson and Fender models. While the audience might not consciously recognize such technical details, they believed these elements contributed to the overall impression of "good music." Much of this process was guided by Hasegawa Yohei’s expertise.

In "그렇고 그런 사이," a vintage 1960s Japanese keyboard called Ace Tone was used, an instrument Hasegawa personally preferred for its "cheap keyboard sound." Although initial tests confirmed its suitability, it malfunctioned during recording. While most members preferred using a Hammond organ available in the studio, Hasegawa and Kiha insisted on using the Ace Tone. Hasegawa eventually repaired it temporarily with cotton swabs, and the track was successfully recorded in a single take.

== Music and lyrics ==
All tracks on Chang Kiha and the Faces were written by Kiha. According to Lee Min-gi, the title track was selected through the following process: "Chang Kiha brought in the song, and when we first heard it, we thought it was really interesting. … At some point, both I and the other members found ourselves singing along to the chorus, and Hasegawa Yohei, who had been observing all of this, said, ‘So, this has to be the title track.’"

Kiha stated that he created "I Saw TV" with the intention of "trying to do something like Lou Reed." He also named "I Have No One I Want to See" as his favorite track on the album, adding that it was the last song completed for the record. "Let’s Meet Now" was produced in collaboration with Leessang. "It’s Not Like They Said Anything About Me" was written, according to Kiha, as an expression of inferiority triggered by praise from those around him.

Drummer Kim Hyun-ho noted that "compared to the demo version, the final album version of this song is the one that changed the most," and therefore the band leaves considerable room for improvisation during live performances. The members described the album's music as "absorbing the nutrients of retro while remaining distinctly 2000s in character."

A representative from the band's label, BGBG Records, stated that "unlike the first album, the second will include additional keyboard sounds, giving it a more psychedelic feel overall." During an interview with Wave while on hiatus, Kiha also said that the second album would "probably be more of a ‘straight rock’ record rather than folk rock." The label's CEO, Ko Geon-hyeok, similarly described the work as being developed into "psychedelic rock."

When asked whether the influence of earlier Korean rock acts such as Sanulrim and Songolmae had become more prominent, Kiha responded that it was difficult to attribute the influence solely to those artists, stating that while he deeply respects them, he was also influenced by a wide range of foreign music. He added that he selected sounds based on what best suited each song during the writing process.

GQ editor Yoo Ji-seong noted that folk elements had decreased, stating that "the proportion of synthesizers has increased compared to guitars, and guitar parts also make heavy use of fuzz effects." According to Yonhap News reporter Lee Eun-jeong, while the first album was strongly acoustic folk rock, this release leans toward analog-feeling plugged-in band music. She further described the second album as an extension of the retro-and-originality balance found in signature songs such as "Cheap Coffee" and "Nothing Special," but with a broader and more refined sonic range. She added that within a single track like "I Have No One I Want to See," the chorus reflects 1960s–70s British and American music styles while the intro evokes the 1970s; "Deep Night Phonebook" incorporates 1980s–90s influences in its chorus; and "So-So Relationship" is arranged in an 1980s style, yet each track retains a strong sense of contemporaneity.

Music critic Kang Heon described the album as "a low-alcohol liquor fermented in the barrel of contemporary South Korean youth’s ordinariness, made from the remaining material after removing seriousness from Kim Min-gi, anger from Jung Tae-chun, literary lyricism from Sanulrim, experimental aesthetics from Shin Jung-hyeon and the Yup Juns, and exaggeration from Hwang Shin-hye Band."

Wave critic Choi Min-woo wrote that "the album’s temporal and spatial axis largely revolves around 1960s and 1970s Korean rock," noting that this also shares visual and stylistic affinities with the debut album of Mimi Sisters.

== Music videos ==
Kiha directed the music videos for the album tracks "I Saw TV" and "So-So Relationship" himself. The two videos were released on June 2 and 9, 2011, respectively. Regarding the decision to release "I Saw TV" first, Kiha explained that if both videos were released simultaneously, the more provocative track "So-So Relationship" might overshadow it.

The production involved cinematographer Cho Sang-yoon, art director Woo Seung-mi, and lighting director Hong Seung-cheol, among others. Kiha stated that he had long been interested in the relationship between music and visual media, and regretted not being able to produce music videos during the first album cycle. He added that he had always wanted to create music videos for the second album and described the experience of being called "Director Chang" for the first time as deeply fulfilling, noting that it felt like a long-held dream had come true.

In a 2011 interview with 트렌드, Kiha stated, “Even Michel Gondry, who is famous as a music video director, would not have been able to make it better than I did. I was worried since it was my first work, but is there really anyone else who could understand my song better than I do and translate it into video?"

Both music videos are notable for being filmed entirely in a single continuous take from beginning to end.Chang recalled that there was a particularly difficult scene in the latter part of "I Saw TV" requiring exaggerated laughter, and that he spent considerable time trying to imagine the funniest person he knew to perform it properly.

“So-So Relationship" features an experimental concept composed solely of finger choreography performed by the band members. In an MBC interview, Chang explained that he aimed to achieve maximum impact with minimal cost, suggesting that close-up shots of human body parts could replace wide scenic imagery. He also noted that the entire production cost amounted to little more than the rental fees for cameras and lighting equipment.

In a Seoul Shinmun interview, he further explained the concept behind the choreography, stating that hands sometimes appear human-like when observed closely, and that he believed hands alone could serve as strong performers. He also emphasized his intention to create a twist: viewers would initially assume the video consisted only of hands, before the full band suddenly appears at the end. He added that this was also meant to highlight the band as a group, reinforcing their identity as a collective musical act.

The music video for "So-So Relationship" surpassed 250,000 YouTube views within two weeks of release,and was selected as one of the "Top 10 Hot Issue Videos of the Week" by Etoday's Tagstory selection.

== Release and promotion ==
The album reached number 1 in sales rankings at major online retailers, including Yes24, Aladin, and Kyobo Book Centre's online store, the day after its release. Pre-orders alone sold out 15,000 copies, prompting the production of an additional 10,000 copies on the album's release day. A further batch of 5,000 copies was also sold out immediately.

On June 10, the album's title track, "So-So Relationship", reached No. 1 on Bugs, while the album track "I Saw TV" ranked No. 7. The album also reached No. 5 on Hanteo Chart, South Korea's largest album sales tracking chart.

In January 2014, the album was reissued as a limited-edition LP available in blue and black vinyl versions. To produce the LP edition, all tracks were remastered and lacquer cutting was carried out at Abbey Road Studios in the United Kingdom.

To promote the album, Chang Kiha and the Faces held a three-day concert series from June 17 to 19 at Samsung Hall of Ewha Womans University in Seoul. Thirty ticket purchasers selected by lottery were invited to a special pre-release listening session, where they were given the opportunity to hear all tracks from the album before its official release and meet the band members.

According to the band's agency, the event was organized as a gesture of appreciation after all seats for the concert celebrating the release of the second studio album sold out. Tickets for the album release concerts were completely sold out on the day sales opened, and the concerts ranked fourth on Interpark's weekly concert reservation chart on May 17.

A representative stated that additional tickets released in response to overwhelming fan demand were sold out immediately upon becoming available, adding that fans were actively seeking ticket transfers through the band's message boards and other music-related online communities.

== Critical reception ==
=== Awards and accolaeds ===
The album received widespread recognition from both critics and the public. It won the Album of the Month category at the inaugural Olleh Music Indie Awards, which was determined through an online vote, receiving an overwhelming share of the votes.

In a year-end poll conducted among 20 popular music critics, the album was ranked Album of the Year, surpassing Long Way Home, the first solo album released in 25 years by Deulgukhwa guitarist Cho Deok-hwan.It also topped the Song of the Year category, making it a double winner. The winning song, "So-So Relationship," received nearly twice as much support as the runner-up.

At the 9th Korean Music Awards, Chang Kiha and the Faces won Album of the Year and Best Rock Album. The band also received nominations in six categories, including Song of the Year, Best Rock Song, Musician of the Year, and Netizens' Musician of the Year, tying with Lee Seung-yeol for the highest number of nominations that year.

At the award ceremony held on February 29, 2012, the band won four awards—Album of the Year, Musician of the Year, Best Rock Song, and Best Rock Album—becoming the first act in the history of the awards to achieve a four-award sweep in a single year.

=== Critical reception ===
Music critic Kang Heon described the album as "a refreshing antidote of humor capable of dispelling the steadily rising discomfort of everyday life." He wrote that the album possessed "an addictive quality distinct from that of girl-group hook songs," arguing that its musical foundation lay in the subtle resonance of the Korean language shaped by the sensibilities of contemporary youth. He further praised the album for vividly portraying the inner landscape of South Korea's so-called "880,000 won generation," from the opening track "Why Are You So Surprised?" through the title track "So-So Relationship" and "It's Not Like They Said Anything About Me."

Kim Ha-jin of TenAsia noted that the album's sound was considerably richer than that of its predecessor. He argued that the addition of keyboards and expanded guitar arrangements demonstrated the band's musical growth, and suggested that although the group had previously seemed unconcerned with mainstream appeal, several songs on the album appeared to have been created with a broader audience in mind.

Music critic Kim Jakga wrote in an editorial that while the single "Cheap Coffee" and the debut album Nothing Happens relied largely on Chang Kiha's distinctive style somewhere "between rapping and singing," the second album represented a complete transformation toward a full band sound. He argued that "Chang Kiha" had finally become "Chang Kiha and the Faces," praising the band's ability to absorb and reinterpret the language of 1960s and 1970s rock music. He described the achievement as a rare innovation in the history of Korean popular music and characterized it as an accomplishment that surpassed even Lee Seung-yeol's musical "expansion" by achieving genuine "innovation."

Choi Min-woo of the music webzine Wave wrote that the band, and Kiha in particular, no longer relied heavily on the kitschy wit that had initially made them famous. While Chang continued to blend spoken-word delivery with singing, Choi observed that the humor and sarcasm had become more restrained and that the lyrics were more refined and focused. He awarded the album 8 out of 10, praising Chang's clear diction and expressive delivery.

Not all reviews were entirely favorable. Lee Jong-min of IZM summarized the album with the phrase "Chang Kiha's vocal style remains not yet fully realized." While acknowledging improvements in the sophistication of the arrangements, he criticized Kiha's vocal approach, arguing that he continued to favor a dry, speech-like delivery and struggled to fully commit either to singing or to spoken-word performance. He awarded the album 3 out of 5 stars.

Professional ratings
Review scores
Source	Rating
IZM	3/5 stars

By contrast, fellow IZM critic Kim Hak-seon praised the recruitment of guitarist and producer Hasegawa Yohei, calling it a "masterstroke."He argued that under the guidance of the experienced musician, the band had firmly established its identity while making Chang Kiha's artistic character even more distinct. Kim further commended Chang's continued use of simple melodies, retro-inspired sounds, and conversational lyricism, noting that the appeal of his colloquial spoken-language style had become even more refined while the lyrics themselves had grown more polished.

Publication	List	Rank	Ref.
Music Y	Album of the Year of 2011	6	
Weiv	The best Korean albums of 2011	1	

== Track listing ==
No.	Title	Length
1.	"What's so Shocking About It?" ("뭘 그렇게 놀래")	4:09
2.	"A Sort of Relationship" ("그렇고 그런 사이")	3:43
3.	"Didn't You Tell Me Not to be Hard on You?" ("모질게 말하지 말라며")	3:44
4.	"I Watched TV" ("TV를 봤네")	3:39
5.	"I Have Nobody to Miss But..." ("보고 싶은 사람도 없는데")	4:17
6.	"Midnight Phone Book" ("깊은 밤 전화번호부")	3:18
7.	"I Must See You Now" ("우리 지금 만나")	3:33
8.	"A Good Old Song" ("그 때 그 노래")	3:23
9.	"I Just Keep Walking" ("마냥 걷는다")	5:27
10.	"Although I Heard Nothing to Feel Bad About..." ("날 보고 뭐라 그런 것도 아닌데")	8:19
11.	"I Watched TV (Again)" ("TV를 봤네 (다시)")	1:02

== Personnel ==
Credits adapted from K-POP ARCHIVE

=== Chang Kiha and the Faces ===
- Chang Kiha – vocals, chorus
- Kim Hyun-ho – drums, percussion, chorus
- Jung Joong-yup – bass, chorus
- Lee Min-ki – guitar, chorus
- Lee Jong-min – keyboards, chorus

=== Production ===
- All songs written by Chang Kiha
- All songs arranged by Chang Kiha and the Faces and Yohei Hasegawa (a.k.a. Kim Yang-pyeong)
- All songs performed by Chang Kiha and the Faces and Yohei Hasegawa (a.k.a. Kim Yang-pyeong)
- Except "I Saw TV (Again)", which features Seong Ji-song on cello
- Producers – Chang Kiha, Yohei Hasegawa (a.k.a. Kim Yang-pyeong)
- Executive producer – Kang Myung-jin ("Bear Boss")

=== Technical ===
- Recording and mixing engineer – Ko Hyun-jung (at Seoul Studio and Dream Factory)
- Assistant engineers – Kim Il-ho, Park Ji-yeon
- Mastering engineer – Jeon Hoon (at Sonic Korea)
- Sound supervisor – Najam Su

=== Artwork and management ===
- Cover design and artwork – Kim Ki-jo (Kijoside)
- Promotion – Kang So-hee, Kwon Sun-wook, Lee Ju-ho (BGBG Records)
- Distribution – Song Dae-hyun, Kim Seol-hwa (BoongBoong Pacific)
- Management – Kang Myung-jin, Kang Jun-sik (Duru Duru AMC)
