= Bongjeingan =

South Korean indie rock band

- Origin: Seoul, South Korea
- Genres: Indie rock; math rock
- Years active: 2022–present
- Labels: DRDR AC
- Members: Chiyoonhae; Lim Hyeonje; Jeon Iljoon

Bongjeingan (Korean: 봉제인간) is a South Korean indie rock band. The band was formed in 2022 and consists of Chiyoonhae (the member of Parasol and Sultan of the Disco), Lim Hyeonje (the member of Hyukoh), and Jeon Iljoon (the member of Kiha & The Faces). The band released a studio album 12 Languages (12가지 말들) (2023).

== History ==
Bongjeingan is a supergroup consisting of Chiyoonhae (the member of Parasol and Sultan of the Disco), Lim Hyeonje (the member of Hyukoh), and Jeon Iljoon (the member of Kiha & The Faces). The discussions on the formation began when they accidentally joined the ensemble. The band was officially formed in May 2022 when they supported the concert of Hyodo & Bass. They performed at the Pentaport Rock Festival and the DMZ Peace Train Music Festival shortly after their formation, and gained popularity with their distinctive style.

They released a single in December 2022 consisting of two tracks, Gaekkum and Good, of which they released a music video for Good. Kim Byeongwoo of Music Y described the song as "It's a single that shines fresh with a comeback that flashes like a spark while the half-cut lyrics and music sparkle and then disappears." They released their first studio album 12 Languages (12가지 말들) in 2023.

== Discography ==
=== Studio albums ===
- 12 Languages (12가지 말들) (2023)
