= 12 Languages =

Studio album by Bongjeingan
- Released: October 4, 2023
- Recorded: Gapyeong Music Village
- Genre: Indie rock, math rock
- Length: 37:23
- Label: DRDR AC
- Producer: Bongjeingan, Genie Kang

12 Languages (Korean: 12가지 말들; RR: 12gaji maldeul) is the debut studio album by South Korean indie rock band Bongjeingan. The album was released on 4 October 2023.

== Background ==
Bongjeingan is a supergroup formed by members of Parasol, Hyukoh and Jang Kiha & The Faces. Immediately after their formation, they performed at various festivals. They interviewed that while making the album, they sought freedom rather than the way it was set, and Chiyoonhae said the recording process of the album as "First, we hold the instrument, sit down, and jam, and the result comes out. Whether it's wrong or not, let's think that the three of us are trying to match the Lego pieces" The album was recorded in Gapyeong County.

== Critical reception ==
Jeong Imyong of Visla Magazine described the album as "40 minutes of drive with ever-changing." Yoo Seongeun of Music Y reviewed "Monster-like music that creates the flow of consciousness itself into popular style rock by adding a strong desire to create creativity, a high degree of understanding of genres, and a high degree of completion."

== Track listing ==
No.	Title	Length
1.	"12 Languages" ("12가지 말들")	3:46
2.	"Baby"	3:20
3.	"Kiss"	3:56
4.	"Bat" ("박쥐")	1:21
5.	"Kkubureong Granny" ("꾸부렁 할머니")	3:58
6.	"Previous Story" ("지난 이야기")	2:44
7.	"Good Night"	3:43
8.	"Guitar Hero : Dreams Come True"	3:31
9.	"Night Running" ("밤의 달리기")	3:27
10.	"You Are My Shackle" ("너만 없으면")	3:33
11.	"Twist It" ("비틀어")	4:04
