= Someday =

Someday or Some Day may refer to:

== Film and television ==
- Someday (1935 film), a British film directed by Michael Powell
- Someday (2011 film), a Japanese film directed by Junji Sakamoto
- Someday (2021 film), an Indian Hindi-language short film directed by Shefali Shah
- Kabhi Na Kabhi (lit. 'Someday'), a 1998 Indian Hindi-language film
- Some Day (TV series), a 2010 Hong Kong sitcom
- Someday (TV series), a 2006 South Korean drama
- Someday, a 2013 South Korean streaming TV series on Naver TV
- "Someday...", an episode of The Marvelous Mrs. Maisel

== Literature ==
- "Someday" (short story), a 1956 story by Isaac Asimov
- Someday, a 2018 novel by David Levithan

== Music ==
=== Albums ===
- Someday (Crystal Gayle album) or the title song, 1995
- Someday (J-Walk album) or the title song, 2002
- Someday (Parasol album) or the title song, 2015
- Someday (Susanna Hoffs album), 2012
- Someday (Yanni album) or the title song (see below), 1999
- Someday (Younha album), 2008
- Someday... (album), by Cindy Blackman, 2001
- Someday, by Arlo Guthrie, 1986
- Someday, by Frank Carillo & The Bandoleros, 2008

=== Songs ===
- "Some Day" (1925 song), written by Rudolf Friml and Brian Hooker for The Vagabond King; covered by Frankie Laine, 1954
- "Someday" (Alan Jackson song), 1991
- "Someday" (Alcazar song), 2003
- "Someday" (CeCe Rogers song), 1987, covered by M People
- "Someday?" (Concrete Blonde song), 1992
- "Someday" (Disney song), from The Hunchback of Notre Dame, 1996
- "Someday" (Flipsyde song), 2005
- "Someday" (Glass Tiger song), 1986
- "Someday" (Julian Lennon song), 2013
- "Someday" (Kalomoira song), 2004
- "Someday" (Kygo and Zac Brown song), 2020
- "Someday" (Mariah Carey song), 1990
- "Someday" (Michael Learns to Rock song), 1995
- "Someday" (Nickelback song), 2003
- "Someday" (Nina Girado song), 2006
- "Someday" (No Angels song), 2003
- "Someday" (OneRepublic song), 2021
- "Someday" (Rob Thomas song), 2009
- "Someday" (Steve Earle song), from Guitar Town, 1986
- "Someday" (The Strokes song), 2002
- "Someday" (Sugar Ray song), 1999
- "Someday" (Vince Gill song), 2003
- "Someday (I Will Understand)", by Britney Spears, 2005
- "Someday (I'm Coming Back)", by Lisa Stansfield, 1992
- "Someday (Place in the Sun)", by Tinie Tempah, 2013
- "Someday (You'll Want Me to Want You)", written by Jimmie Hodges, 1944; covered by many artists
- "Someday"/"Boys & Girls", by Kumi Koda, 2006
- "Someday", by 7 Angels 7 Plagues from Jhazmyne's Lullaby
- "Someday", by the Afters from I Wish We All Could Win
- "Someday", by Ash from Free All Angels
- "Someday", by the Black Eyed Peas from The Beginning
- "Someday", by the Carpenters from Ticket to Ride
- "Someday", by Christopher Cross from Back of My Mind
- "Someday", by Christopher Von Uckermann from Somos
- "Someday", by Cold Chisel from Blood Moon
- "Someday", by Coldrain from Final Destination
- "Someday", by Crossfade from Falling Away
- "Someday", by Crystal Gayle from Someday
- "Someday", by David Gates from Never Let Her Go
- "Someday", by Embrace from Out of Nothing
- "Someday", by Emyli
- "Someday", by Enuff Z'Nuff from Paraphernalia
- "Someday", by Fitz and the Tantrums from Let Yourself Free
- "Someday", by GFriend from Snowflake
- "Someday", by Greg Kihn Band from Kihnspiracy
- "Someday", by Godsmack from When Legends Rise
- "Someday", by JJ Cale and Walt Richmond, better known through cover by Eric Clapton and Mark Knopfler on The Breeze: An Appreciation of JJ Cale
- "Someday", by John Legend
- "Someday", by Ké
- "Someday", by Keisha White, theme song from the TV series The Story of Tracy Beaker
- "Someday", by Kylie Minogue from Body Language
- "Someday", by Lesley Gore from Ever Since
- "Someday", by LP from Forever for Now
- "Someday", by Michael Bublé from Nobody but Me
- "Someday", by Michael W. Smith from I'll Lead You Home
- "Someday", by Mike Errico
- "Someday", by Moby Grape from Moby Grape
- "Someday", by Naaz from Bits of Naaz
- "Someday", by Neil Young from Freedom
- "Someday", by Project Rocket from the split EP Project Rocket / Fall Out Boy
- "Someday", by Ray Charles
- "Some Day", by Shinedown from Us and Them
- "Someday", by Silent Poets
- "Someday", by Slinkee Minx
- "Someday", by Tegan and Sara from Sainthood
- "Someday", by Two Door Cinema Club from Beacon
- "Someday", by U-KISS from Neverland
- "Someday", by Ween from Shinola, Vol. 1
- "Someday", by Yanni from Niki Nana
- "Someday", by Zebrahead from Waste of Mind
- "Someday", from the film Zombies 3
- "Someday", from the musical Memphis
- "Someday", from the musical The Wedding Singer
- "Someday (August 29, 1968)", by Chicago from The Chicago Transit Authority
- "Some Day", by Norther from Circle Regenerated

== See also ==
- "Someday, Someday", a song by Thirsty Merc
- Somedays (disambiguation)
- Sumday, an album by Grandaddy
