= Absent Light =

Studio album by Misery Signals
- Released: July 23, 2013
- Recorded: 2013
- Genre: Progressive metalcore
- Length: 42:52
- Label: Basick
- Producer: Greg Thomas, Ryan Morgan

Misery Signals chronology
Controller (2008)	Absent Light (2013)	Ultraviolet (2020)

Singles from Absent Light
- 1. "Luminary" Released: July 3, 2013

Professional ratings
Review scores
Source	Rating
Absolute Punk	70%
Alternative Press	3.5/5 stars

Absent Light is the fourth studio album by American-Canadian metalcore band Misery Signals and was released on July 23, 2013. The album was produced by guitarists Greg Thomas and Ryan Morgan, a first for the band. The album cover was illustrated by Adam Rosenlund. This is the band's last album with vocalist Karl Schubach.

== Background ==
The band's previous album, Controller was released in 2008. The band would tour in support of the album for nearly a year before going on hiatus to focus on other projects. Vocalist Karl Schubach formed a solo project called Solace and launched a Kickstarter to help fund the project. As part of the funding incentives, Schubach provided vocals on a song by the UK metalcore band The Divided.

Guitarist Ryan Morgan and bassist Kyle Johnson formed the hardcore punk band Burning Empires with members of Fall Out Boy. Rhythm guitarist Stuart Ross and drummer Branden Morgan formed the post-hardcore band Lowtalker with members of Comeback Kid. Ross would leave Misery Signals in 2010, becoming the vocalist for UK pop punk band Living with Lions, becoming tired of performing heavy metal. Later that year, Johnson would leave Misery Signals as well.

Following the departure of Ross and Johnson, the remaining members of the band released a statement that Misery Signals had not broken up. In early 2012, the band released a cover of the Pink Floyd song "Us and Them" for the video game Homefront. The song was released for free download on March 22, 2012. The following month, Schubach released a series of tweets that the band was practicing again and working on new material. The band launched an Indiegogo campaign to help fund the upcoming album.

The band released the song "Luminary" on July 3, 2013.

== Track listing ==
All tracks are written by Misery Signals

No.	Title	Length
1.	"A Glimmer of Hope"	2:04
2.	"Luminary"	3:19
3.	"Reborn (An Execution)"	3:44
4.	"Carrier" (feat. Matthew Mixon of 7 Angels 7 Plagues)	4:29
5.	"Shadows and Depth"	5:01
6.	"Lost Relics" (feat. Todd Mackey of With Honor)	3:11
7.	"Two Solitudes"	4:51
8.	"Departure"	4:13
9.	"The Shallows"	4:15
10.	"Ursa Minor"	3:39
11.	"Everything Will Rust" (feat. Fredua Boakye of Bad Rabbits)	4:06
Total length:		42:52

Album B-sides
No.	Title	Length
1.	"Sunlifter"	3:50
2.	"Like Yesterday" (Re-Recorded)	3:58

== Personnel ==
Misery Signals

- Karl Schubach – lead vocals
- Ryan Morgan – lead guitar, backing vocals
- Greg Thomas – rhythm guitar
- Kyle Johnson – bass
- Branden Morgan – drums

Additional personnel

- Produced by Greg Thomas and Ryan Morgan
- Mixed by Steve Evetts
- Mastered by Alan Douches
- Additional Production by Will Putney
- Additional Engineering by Eric Rachel, Karl Schubach, Chris Teti, Andrew Glover and Adam Capps
- Assisted by Randy Leboeuf and Kris Yates
- Preproduction Engineered by Kevin Arndt
- Guest vocals on "Carrier" by Matthew Mixon of 7 Angels 7 Plagues
- Guest vocals on "Lost Relics" by Todd Mackey of With Honor
- Guest vocals on "Everything Will Rust" by Fredua Boakye of Bad Rabbits
- Orchestral string movements composed by Greg Thomas and Randy Slaugh
- Strings arranged and produced by Randy Slaugh
- String sessions engineered by Ken Dudley
- Violin: Juliann Eldridge, Emily Dixon
- Viola: Kelsey Georgeson
- Cello: Sara Cerrato, Samaquias Lorta
- Percussion: Rick Morgan
- Additional programming: Brian Southall, Dave Swanson
- Crew vocals: Kyle Kearney, Daniel Graves, Chris Teti, Blane Christenson, Johnny Perrin, and Brady Murphy
