= Human Mind (album) =

Human Mind (사람의 마음)

Studio album by Kiha & The Faces
- Released: October 15, 2014
- Genre: Rock
- Length: 51:40
- Language: Korean
- Label: Universal
- Producers: Jang Kiha, Yohei Hasegawa

Kiha & The Faces chronology
| Kiha & The Faces (장기하와 얼굴들) (2011) | Human Mind (사람의 마음) (2014) | Who's Good At Their Own Love? (내 사랑에 노련한 사람이 어딨나요) (2016) |

Human mind (사람의 마음) is the third studio album by the South Korean band Kiha & The Faces (장기하와 얼굴들). All songs on the album were written by Chang Kiha, while Chang and Yohei Hasegawa served as co-producers. In addition to the two producers, all members of Kiha & The faces(장기하와 얼굴들) participated in the arrangement process. At a press conference held on 13 October 2014, Chang summarized the album by stating that the band had "tried to create a sound faithful to the fundamentals of rock and roll." He also described it as an album that was "worked on diligently to demonstrate that the three years and four months since the previous release had not been wasted." The title track, "Human mind(사람의 마음)", was inspired by stories Chang heard from listeners and the advice he gave them while hosting a radio program every night.

The album cover was designed by Kim Gijo, chief designer of Bunga Bunga Records, who had also designed the cover of the band's previous release. Chang explained, "After listening to the entire album, I asked him what came to mind, and he suggested an image of a heart with its blood vessels clearly visible. I liked it. The Human mind(사람의 마음) is often represented by a heart symbol, but that image seems to separate the mind from the body. The heart on our album cover is an actual organ, and I liked how it blurred the boundary between mind and body." The music videos for "My people(내 사람)" and "Human mind(사람의 마음)" were produced by editing footage of Chang Kiha performing an improvised dance.

The album includes "Almost Good(좋다 말았네)", which had been released in advance on 29 March 2013. Human mind(사람의 마음) was released on 15 October 2014, three years and four months after the release of the band's previous album, Kiha & The faces(장기하와 얼굴들), while "My people(내 사람)" was released in advance on 7 October. The album was produced in two versions, a digital edition and a physical edition. The digital edition contains twelve tracks, including the title track "Human mind(사람의 마음)", while the physical edition includes "Have You Been Well?(별 일 없었니)" as a bonus track. Upon its release, the album achieved strong commercial success and was received favorably by both critics and the public. To commemorate the release of the new album, the band embarked on a nationwide tour beginning in Seoul on 23 October, followed by performances in Daejeon, Daegu, Jeonju, and Busan.

== Background ==
With their second studio album, Kiha & The faces(장기하와 얼굴들) (2011), Kiha & The faces(장기하와 얼굴들) won four awards at the Korean Music Awards, including Album of the Year, Musician of the Year, Best Rock Album, and Best Rock Song. In an interview with Nylon(나일론) magazine on 20 December 2013, the band discussed their third album, stating that they were planning "a more powerful rock and roll sound than the first and second albums." They added that Chang Kiha had drawn considerable inspiration from his work as a radio DJ and that most of the songs intended for the album had already been completed. On 20 August 2014, a source involved in the album told Star News, "Post-production work on the songs has been completed, and we are currently in the planning stage for the music videos. September seems a little early, and we are aiming for an October release. As with the previous album, Chang Kiha will likely direct the music videos himself."

On 1 October 2014, a teaser video was released. In the teaser, Chang stands motionless and gazes into the camera while numbers are counted aloud, heightening anticipation for the album. At the end of the video, the phrase "The Mind of My Person" appears on screen. The words "My Person" light up first, revealing the date "2014.10.07", followed by "Human mind(사람의 마음)" and the date "2014.10.15", indicating the release dates of the pre-release single and the album, respectively. At noon on 7 October, "My Person" was released in advance through various online music platforms.

On 13 October, a listening session and press conference commemorating the release of Human mind(사람의 마음) was held at Mudaeryuk in Hapjeong-dong, Mapo District, Seoul. Addressing the delay between the band's second and third albums, Chang stated that frequent appearances on television programs had partly contributed to it. During the press conference, Chang remarked, "We worked hard to show that we had not wasted our time." He continued, "I wrote and composed the songs myself, while the arrangements were developed collaboratively. Since 'Cheap Coffee(싸구려 커피)', I have never written songs with a predetermined concept for an entire album. These songs emerged naturally, and when gathered together, they turned out to be about the Human mind(사람의 마음). They contain experiences that almost anyone could relate to." On the same day, Yohei Hasegawa commented, "This is the first album that truly feels like a collaborative effort. Although I have always been involved in production, I think many more ideas were contributed to this third album, and it feels less like Chang Kiha alone and more like Kiha & The faces(장기하와 얼굴들) as a band." Chang added that although the members' opinions were reflected extensively throughout the process, the overall sound was intentionally stripped down.

== Recording ==
Chang Kiha and Yohei Hasegawa served as co-producers, while all members of Kiha & The faces(장기하와 얼굴들) participated in arranging the songs. To achieve the highest-quality sound, the band devoted considerable effort to the album's production, recording in studios both in South Korea and abroad and experimenting with various mixing and mastering approaches. Before beginning the main recording sessions, the band first recorded demo versions in their rehearsal room and later completed the final recordings in professional studios. However, after listening back, they found that the demo recordings often captured a better atmosphere, and nearly half of the tracks on the album ultimately used those recordings. Chang explained, "We tried every possible approach to achieve the sound we wanted for all thirteen tracks. We even experimented with different recording engineers, which resulted in two or three versions of each song. Some were recorded in our rehearsal room, while others were recorded in large outside studios. In the end, we invested enough time to record the equivalent of more than thirty songs."

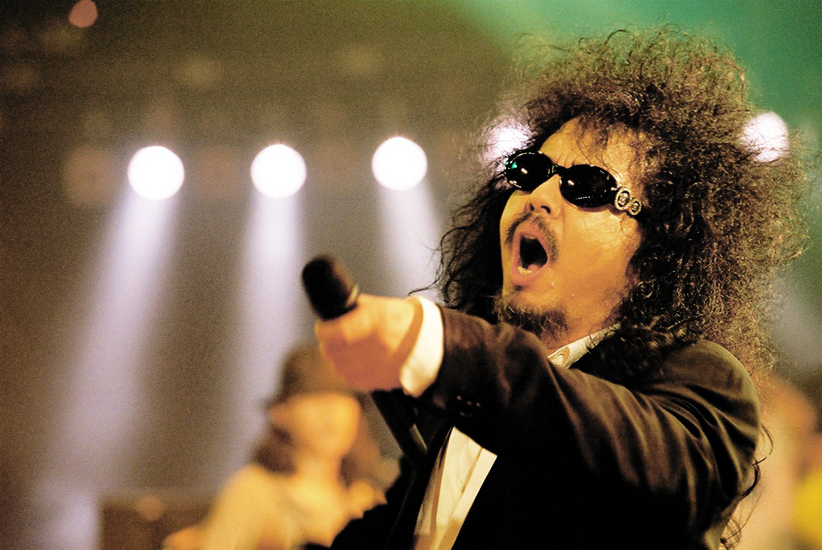
When they first met while appearing together on a television program in 2012, Jeon in kwon told the band, "You understand the joys and sorrows of ordinary people. If necessary, feel free to make use of me whenever you want."

Mastering was handled by Soichiro Nakamura, a Japanese engineer and close friend of Hasegawa. Multiple mastered versions were produced, including one by an American engineer, resulting in three versions overall. Excluding Hasegawa, the remaining band members conducted a blind listening test and selected the final master

The Mellotron, an instrument famously used by the Beatles during the 1960s, was featured on "Please Call My Name(내 이름을 불러주세요)" and "Being Kind Is Not a Bad Thing(착한 건 나쁜 게 아니야)". Hasegawa said that after hearing the demo of "Please Call My Name(내 이름을 불러주세요)", he was impressed and wanted to enhance the track's quality. Around that time, Soichiro Nakamura, who later mastered the album, informed him that he had purchased a Mellotron, prompting Hasegawa to personally bring the instrument in before recording began. The band noted that during the production of their second album they had only used a VST emulation of the instrument. Lee Jong-min explained that for "Please Call My Name(내 이름을 불러주세요)", even the faint background noise generated when the Mellotron was switched on was deliberately inserted into sections where the instrument itself was not playing, including the introduction and ending of the song. In "My Person", a powerful repeating guitar phrase played exclusively on the sixth string of an electric guitar was layered over a main theme performed by a Yamaha DX7 synthesizer and an electric sitar playing in unison. For the title track "Human mind(사람의 마음)", Lee Min-ki recorded the guitar solo heard in the latter half of the song multiple times in order to achieve the most exhausted-sounding performance possible. Regarding "Miser(구두쇠)", Chang wrote, "The banjo guitar used here created a warm and rustic atmosphere, while the vintage organ that had been used to create a laid-back mood in 'Heard It Through the Rumor(풍문으로 들었소)' was employed in a more playful manner."

Although "Almost Good(좋다 말았네)", which had previously been released through the Blank Check Project, was re-recorded for the album, the band ultimately decided that the original version was superior and included it unchanged. Chang stated that the trombone performance on "Not Coming, Are You?(올 생각을 않네)" was played by keyboardist Lee Jong-min, drawing on skills he had learned during his military band service. For "I Don't Remember", Chang initially recorded a falsetto demo with the intention of featuring a female vocalist, but the demo recording was ultimately retained and the featured vocal was never added. Chang later recalled, "I couldn't think of a suitable female singer, and while I was struggling with the decision, the head of the record label casually suggested, 'Why don't you just use the demo vocal?' I realized that was possible. It was a complete change in perspective. There are even some pitch imperfections because I sang it casually during the demo session, but it ended up becoming one of the most entertaining songs on the album." Regarding "Can't Be Forgotten", Chang wrote, "I wanted the beat to be extremely simple, so we used a rhythm machine from the 1980s. Drummer Jeon Il-jun performed the part by pressing the buttons himself." During the production of "Being Kind Is Not a Bad Thing Pt. 2", the band felt that the section where the song modulates upward and reaches its climactic vocal passage should ideally be sung by Jeon in kwon from the beginning, and he readily agreed to provide the vocals. "Wake-up Time Is Fixed(기상시간은 정해져 있다)", a song Chang had originally released in 2005 during a period of youth unemployment and had continued to perform live, was recorded and included as a full-band version for the first time.

== Music and lyrics ==
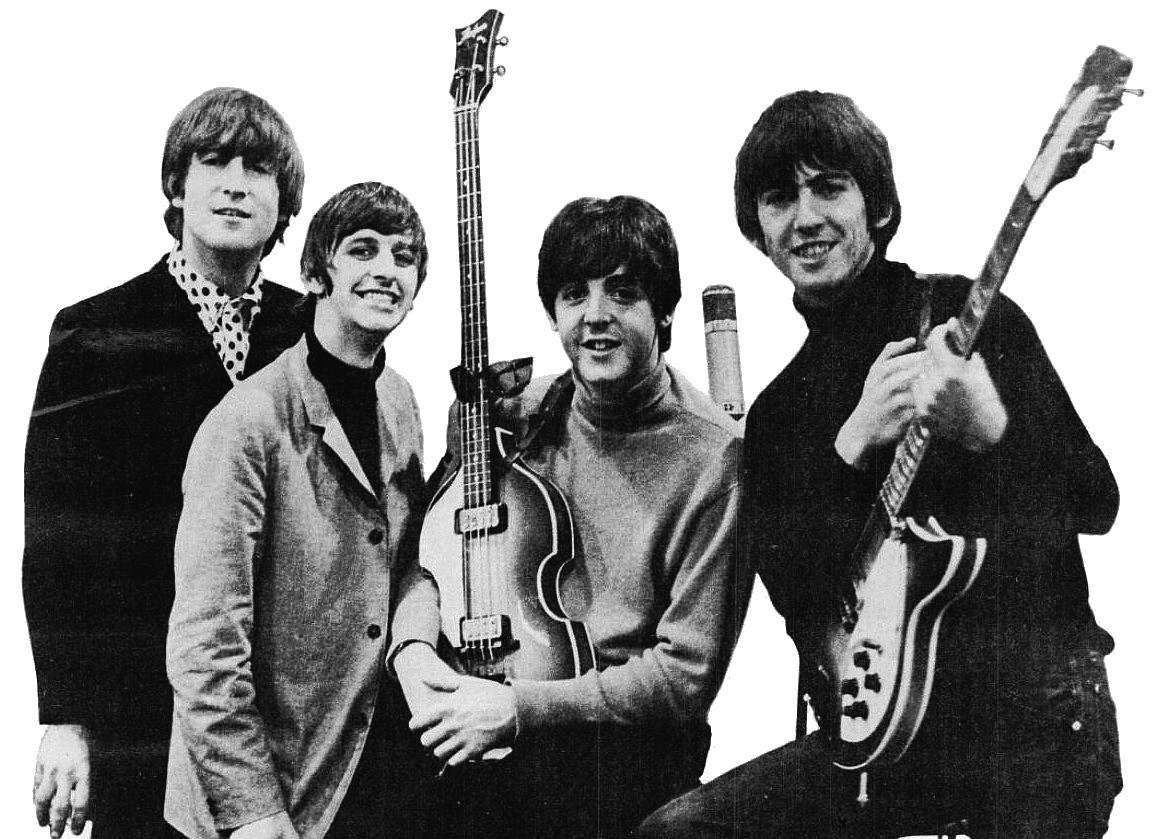
Yohei said, "I worked on the album with the vibe of The Beatles' (pictured) 'Revolver' in mind."

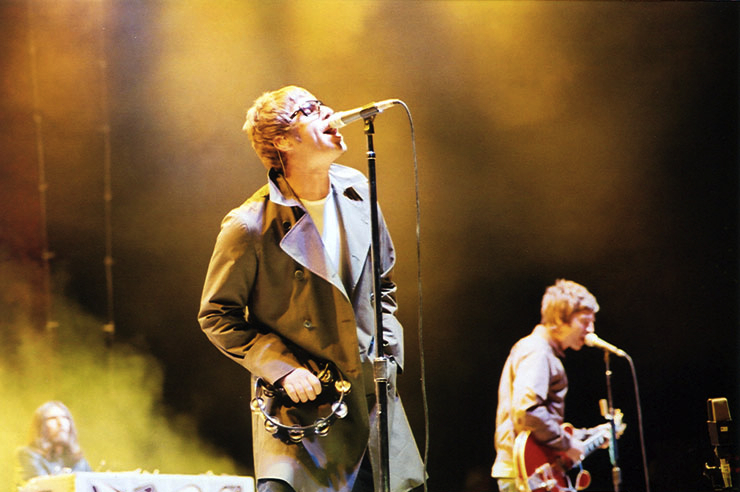
Chang kiha said, "If I hadn't liked Oasis (pictured), the direction of the third album might have been very different."

All songs on the album were written by Chang Kiha. Chang stated, "If there is one major change in terms of sound, it is that the album is simpler and more powerful than our previous works. We tried to create an album that remained faithful to the fundamentals of rock and roll." Hasegawa said, "We kept asking ourselves what rock music should be. As a result, we started removing sounds. Once we focused on texture, the sounds actually became clearer." He also added, "There is psychedelic rock, hard rock, and ballads on the album, but I wanted it to feel like something created collectively by all six members. In the end, I am satisfied with the result." Chang remarked that listening to Oasis led him to appreciate "the appeal of simple, repetitive, and traditional rock and roll." He also cited Tame Impala and Television as influences on the album. Music critic Lee Kyung-jun wrote, "The band has transformed itself into a straightforward rock band without hesitation. Similar attempts existed on previous releases, but this time the intention feels far more deliberate. While the Mellotron, fretless bass, and vintage synthesizers evoke nostalgia for the past, Chang's vocals place a much stronger emphasis on each syllable than before. ... It becomes clear that the album takes the canon of 1960s and 1970s rock classics as its primary model."

Regarding his distinctive vocal style, Chang stated, "The melodies on the third album are generally higher in pitch. As I performed more concerts, I found myself wanting to sing with greater excitement and volume, so the melodies naturally became higher." He continued, "Another thing that changed was that after the second album I took on new activities, namely radio hosting and acting. Practicing different ways of speaking through those experiences seems to have influenced my singing as well. I personally felt that my vocal expressions became more varied." In an interview with ''waiv'', he stated, "In the case of 'There Is Nothing(아무 것도 없잖어)', I was strongly influenced by Bae Cheol soo in terms of pronunciation and vocal delivery. For 'Accept Me(나를 받아주시오)', I was also influenced by Song Chang-sik, whom I greatly admire. Although our vocal tones are different, I imitated him in a very superficial sense." Chang claimed that he had not intentionally addressed social issues on the album, but critic Cha Woo-jin argued that "Human mind(사람의 마음)" contains contemporary social undertones. He wrote, "One can notice this by listening carefully to the lyrics. While dealing with universal emotions, the song simultaneously evokes specific memories. Some listeners may be reminded of Paengmok Harbor, Ansan, and Gwanghwamun Square all at once."

Regarding the title track "Human mind(사람의 마음)", Chang explained, "The song was inspired by stories I heard from listeners while hosting a radio program every night, as well as the advice I gave them. Many people return home feeling uneasy despite having worked tirelessly throughout the day. I often tell them, 'You completed everything you needed to do today. Get some rest and sleep well.' In a way, it was also something I told myself on nights when I felt emotionally exhausted." Critic Cha Woo-jin wrote that the vocal performance and musical atmosphere of the song serve as an extension of "I Watched TV." "Please Call My Name(내 이름을 불러주세요)" expresses the wish that a person one secretly admires would be the first to ask how one is doing. Regarding "My Person", Chang said that the lyrics and melody came to him while he was simply walking alone through a park. Kwon Seok-jung of ''TenAsia'' wrote that the explosive section around the three-minute-forty-second mark is so dramatic that it resembles a musical depiction of climax, suggesting that the song metaphorically portrays the process of sexual intimacy. Music critic Lee Kyung-jun wrote that the song goes beyond lyrical wit and fully internalizes and reinterprets the sound of The Doors. "Miser(구두쇠)" is an autobiographical song written by Chang.

"Not Coming, Are You?(올 생각을 않네)" expresses the frustration of waiting for someone who never arrives. "Unknown Person(알 수 없는 사람)" originated from a remark made by one of Chang's acquaintances, who once told him, "You're a really hard person to understand." In an interview with ''Campus Tomorrow(대학내일)'', Chang described "I Don't Remember(기억 안 나)" as a rather terrible song, explaining, "A woman remembers everything that happened the previous night, while the man tells her that he remembers nothing at all." Regarding "Can't Be Forgotten(잊혀지지 않네)", Chang stated that it expresses "a nostalgic longing for memories that anyone might carry with them throughout their life." Discussing "Being Kind Is Not a Bad Thing Pt. 1(착한 건 나쁜 게 아니야 pt.1)", he said, "I often felt that kind people are treated as fools. Being kind is not a bad thing; it is simply being kind. However, I am not virtuous enough to say such things directly, so I brought my grandmother into the lyrics." The song, whose opening section matches the jingle of Chang's radio program, was developed from that jingle long after it had originally been created. Kwon Seok-jung wrote that the extended ending recalls the piano chord played by Paul McCartney at the conclusion of "A Day in the Life". Regarding the CD-exclusive track "Have You Been Well?(별 일 없었니)", which literally asks listeners how they have been, Chang stated that he composed it with the opening of a live concert in mind.

== Music videos ==
"I wanted the music videos to be as simple as possible. At one point, I thought it would be convenient to shoot a single piece of footage and simply change the editing. For the music video of Human mind(사람의 마음), the only thing I decided in advance was that it would be edited at a slower pace. I think My Person(내 사람) turned out just as I had envisioned." -Chang Kiha

The music video for "My Person" was directed by Chang Kiha himself. Appearing in the video, Chang performs an improvised dance from the beginning to the end of the song, moving his body as if it had been released into open air. Having previously explained that the song was "not only about the Human mind(사람의 마음) but also about the human body," Chang stated, "I wanted this song to make people move their bodies. In the music video, I wanted to show myself moving in response to the music," explaining his decision to perform the dance. He also remarked, "I wanted to capture my healthy body on film while I was still young. I'm 33 years old this year, and there's no telling what will happen next year. I may not be able to move like this anymore."

To prepare for the music video, Chang spent approximately three months beginning in June studying dance under choreographer Kim Ki-beom of Ahn Eun-me Company, one of South Korea's leading contemporary dance companies. Explaining his decision to learn contemporary dance, Chang stated, "My goal was not to learn new movements but to better understand my own body. I thought contemporary dance would be the most helpful way to discover how my body could move." However, he later admitted, "The dance I perform is still an improvised dance. Articles were published saying that I studied under a contemporary dance choreographer, but it is still just my own spontaneous dancing. What I wanted to capture was my own unique movement." The music video for "Human mind(사람의 마음)", which was released later, was a re-edited version of the music video for "My Person". Reviewing the video, Cha Woo-jin of ''Weiv'' wrote, "Not only does it recall Thom Yorke's 'Squid', but the music video for 'Human mind(사람의 마음)', which simply recycles footage from 'My Person', is, quite frankly, rather uninteresting."

== Release and promotion ==
''Human mind(사람의 마음)'' was released in two versions: a digital edition and a physical edition. The digital edition contains twelve tracks, including the title track "Human mind(사람의 마음)", while the physical edition includes "Have You Been Well?(별 일 없었니)" as a bonus track. Chang explained that the different track arrangements were not intended as a criticism of contemporary album sales practices. Rather, he believed that listeners who consume music digitally and those who listen on CD approach albums differently. He stated, "Since 'Human mind(사람의 마음)' is the thematic centerpiece of the third album, I thought it would be better for the digital version to present it early on. People who listen to CDs might approach the album more like a film, expecting a twist or conclusion near the end, so I placed the title track later in the track listing." He further remarked, "We live in an era in which CD players have all but disappeared. I wanted to ask listeners who cared enough to buy and listen to the CD how they had been doing. That's why I included the introductory track 'Have You Been Well?(별 일 없었니)' exclusively on the CD edition." He added that he felt especially grateful toward those who listened to the album in that format.

''Human mind(사람의 마음)'' was released on 15 October 2014 through Universal Music, which handled distribution of the album. On 9 December 2016, the band's agency, Duruduru AMC, partnered with the Japanese record manufacturer Toyo Kasei to release the album on LP. All tracks from the third album were remastered for the vinyl release, and the band members personally traveled to Japan to observe the manufacturing process in order to ensure a higher-quality product. Although the LP was made available for online purchase through various Korean music retailers, the entire online allocation sold out during the pre-order period. Copies were subsequently made available for purchase at venues hosting Kiha & The faces(장기하와 얼굴들)' ''Nallomeokneun Naesanosa(날로먹는 내사노사)'' concert series.

Prior to the album's release, Kiha & The faces(장기하와 얼굴들) held a year-end concert titled ''We'll Definitely Release Our Third Album Next Year'' at Olympic Hall in Olympic Park from 30 to 31 December 2013. During the concerts, the band performed several songs from the upcoming album for the first time. The band later gave the first live performances of tracks from the third album on Chang's radio program ''Chang Kiha's Amazing Radio(장기하의 대단한 라디오)''. Tickets for the nationwide tour commemorating the release of the album went on sale through Interpark at 2 p.m. on 18 September 2014. According to the band's agency, the tour accompanied the release of the band's first album in three years and included performances in five cities: Seoul, Daejeon, Daegu, Jeonju, and Busan. Regarding the tour, the band stated, "At last, our third studio album is being released. Despite years of what we jokingly call our 'never-ending setlist performances', audiences have continued to fill our venues with unwaivring support, and we are delighted to be able to perform songs from the new album live for them." The tour began on 23 October at the Lotte Card Art Center Art Hall in Seoul. It continued at the auditorium of Kyungpook National University in Daegu on 8 November, Woosong Arts Center in Daejeon on 16 November, and Samsung Cultural Center at Jeonbuk National University in Jeonju on 22 November. The tour concluded on 6 December at Sohyang Theater Lotte Card Hall in Centum City, Busan.

== Reactions and evaluations ==
Following its release, the album successfully secured positions on major South Korean music charts, including Bugs, Mnet, and Soribada, and received widespread praise from internet users through social media and online communities The title track "Human mind(사람의 마음)" gained particular popularity for its strong performance on music charts during the evening commute hours between 6 p.m. and 8 p.m., earning the nickname "the nation's after-work anthem." To reflect the theme of "Human mind(사람의 마음)", Kiha & The faces(장기하와 얼굴들) produced a motivational video for commuters and released it through their official social media channels. The video spread widely through online communities and generated enthusiastic responses. Responding to controversy over the allegedly suggestive lyrics of "My Person", Chang stated, "Some people told me it sounded like a children's poem that compares the purity of the human heart to nature, while others felt that the song became increasingly explicit the more they listened to it and described it as sexually suggestive. Basically, the interpretation that listeners arrive at is the correct one. Although I had an original intention when writing it, I don't think it is necessary to explain it. I'm simply pleased that the song encourages discussion."

Expert reviews
Review scores
| Source | Score |
|---|---|
| IZM | 3/5 stars |

''Human mind(사람의 마음)'' received generally positive reviews from music critics. The album was selected as Naver Music's "Discovery of the Week" for the third week of October 2014, and music critic Lee Kyung-jun praised it, writing that "even if all of the extra-musical elements such as choreography, gestures, and humor were removed, the album would remain captivating on its own." Kim Do-heon of ''IZM'' wrote, "Only with their third studio album do Kiha & The faces(장기하와 얼굴들) finally focus on the identity of 'Kiha & The faces(장기하와 얼굴들)' rather than simply 'Chang Kiha'. ... The fact that all members participated evenly in the album's production is reflected in its exploration of the universal 'Human mind(사람의 마음)' rather than the story of any particular individual. Compared to the band's earlier work, which centered largely on Chang's own storytelling, the new album draws upon broader and more universal emotions, and its efforts to express them through concise language are noteworthy." However, he also argued that "there are still too many awkward elements to call it a complete achievement. While the choruses are certainly memorable, the band's earlier storytelling vocal style continues to hinder the songs' progression toward them." He nevertheless concluded that "the band's efforts to address many of the weaknesses in its music and fill the sonic void that had previously been lacking represent a clear sign of improvement," awarding the album three out of five stars.

Cha Woo-jin praised the title track "Human mind(사람의 마음)", writing, "When one focuses on the music itself, the vocal delivery is particularly impressive. The way Chang sings, almost as if casually tossing out each phrase, gently brushes against the listener's emotions. That is especially appealing. Furthermore, the sense of sonic space is remarkably effective. Like the insulating layer of a winter coat, it creates a warm and comforting cushion of sound. The instruments remain hidden until the right moment, emerging to embrace one another and build tension before quietly disappearing again. Chang's vocal direction becomes increasingly dramatic, and subtle emotional nuances are reproduced with great care. In doing so, the song naturally attempts to comfort not only those exhausted by the hardships of everyday life, but also those who felt wounded and alienated within South Korean society in 2014." Lim Hee-yoon of ''The Dong-A Ilbo'' described the album as "a serious dramatic work. It dresses a solid musical framework with intricate sound design and arrangements. One feels tempted to cover the artist's name on the album sleeve with black tape and place the CD among records by The Doors, The Beatles, and Jimi Hendrix." However, he also remarked that "the absence of the instantly memorable choruses that have long characterized Chang Kiha's music remains a weakness."

== Track listing ==
The track order differs between the digital download edition and the CD edition. "Have You Been Well?(별 일 없었니)", which appears as track 1 on the CD edition, is exclusive to the CD release.

=== Digital download ===
1. "Human mind(사람의 마음)" – 3:54
2. "Please Call My Name(내 이름을 불러주세요)" – 2:33
3. "My person(내 사람)" – 4:33
4. "Miser(구두쇠)" – 4:34
5. "Not Coming, Are You?(올 생각을 않네)" – 4:00
6. "Unknown Person(알 수 없는 사람)" – 3:49
7. "Almost Good(좋다 말았네)(2014 Remastered)" – 4:15
8. "I Don't Remember(기억 안 나)" – 4:30
9. "Can't Be Forgotten(잊혀지지 않네)" – 3:49
10. "Being Kind Is Not a Bad Thing Pt. 1(착한 건 나쁜 게 아니야 Pt. 1)" – 6:38
11. "Being Kind Is Not a Bad Thing Pt. 2(착한 건 나쁜 게 아니야 Pt. 2)" (featuring 전인권) – 3:41
12. "Wake-up Time Is Fixed(기상시간은 정해져 있다)" – 1:36

=== CD ===
All lyrics and music: Chang Kiha

Track listing
| No. | title | note | playtime |
|---|---|---|---|
| 1 | "별 일 없었니" | CD only track | 3:48 |
| 2 | "내 이름을 불러주세요" | | 2:33 |
| 3 | "내 사람" | | 4:33 |
| 4 | "구두쇠" | | 4:34 |
| 5 | "올 생각을 않네" | | 4:00 |
| 6 | "좋다 말았네" | | 4:15 |
| 7 | "잊혀지지 않네" | | 3:49 |
| 8 | "기억 안 나" | | 4:30 |
| 9 | "알 수 없는 사람" | | 3:49 |
| 10 | "사람의 마음" | | 3:54 |
| 11 | "착한 건 나쁜 게 아니야 Pt. 1" | | 6:38 |
| 12 | "착한 건 나쁜 게 아니야 Pt. 2" | Jeon in kwon's featuring vocals replace Chang kiha's vocals. | 3:41 |
| 13 | "기상시간은 정해져 있다" | | 1:36 |
| 총 재생 시간 | | | 51:40 |
