= Ultraviolet (Misery Signals album) =

Studio album by Misery Signals
- Released: August 7, 2020
- Recorded: 2018–2019
- Studios: Studio Litho, Seattle, Washington; The Tonic Room, Boise, Idaho; Greenhouse Studios, Vancouver, British Columbia
- Genre: Progressive metalcore
- Length: 34:05
- Label: Basick
- Producers: Greg Thomas; Devin Townsend; Matt Bayles; Tim Creviston

Misery Signals chronology
Absent Light (2013)	Ultraviolet (2020)

Singles from Ultraviolet
- 1. "The Tempest" Released: May 15, 2020; 2. "River King" Released: June 19, 2020

Professional ratings
Review scores
Source	Rating
Exclaim!	Positive
Louder Sound	3.5/5 stars
New Noise Magazine	4.5/5 stars
Riff Magazine	7/10
Rock Sins	7.75/10

Ultraviolet is the fifth and final studio album by American-Canadian metalcore band Misery Signals and was released on August 7, 2020. The album marks the first from the band since 2013's Absent Light, as well as their first album with Stu Ross on guitar since 2008's Controller and Jesse Zaraska on vocals since 2004's Of Malice and the Magnum Heart, after vocalist Karl Schubach parted ways with the group.

The album was produced by the band's former rhythm guitarist, Greg Thomas, along with being engineered by Tim Creviston, Devin Townsend and Matt Bayles.

== Track listing ==
All lyrics are written by Jesse Zaraska, except where noted; all music is composed by Misery Signals.

No.	Title	Lyrics	Length
1.	"The Tempest"		3:44
2.	"Sunlifter"	Ryan Morgan	4:00
3.	"River King"	Zaraska, R. Morgan	5:01
4.	"Through Vales of Blue Fire"		2:05
5.	"Old Ghosts"		3:38
6.	"The Fall"	Zaraska, Greg Thomas	4:42
7.	"Redemption Key"	Zaraska, R. Morgan	2:33
8.	"Cascade Locks"	Zaraska, R. Morgan, Kyle Johnson	3:50
9.	"Some Dreams"		4:32

== Personnel ==
Misery Signals

- Jesse Zaraska – vocals
- Ryan Morgan – guitar
- Stu Ross – guitar
- Kyle Johnson – bass
- Branden Morgan – drums

Production

- Greg Thomas – vocal production, mixing
- Devin Townsend – vocal production
- Tim Creviston – guitar production
- Matt Bayles – drum production
- Kris Crummett – mastering
