= Controller (Misery Signals album) =

Studio album by Misery Signals
- Released: July 22, 2008
- Recorded: Early 2008
- Genre: Progressive metalcore
- Length: 41:50
- Label: Ferret
- Producer: Devin Townsend

Misery Signals chronology
Mirrors (2006)	Controller (2008)	Absent Light (2013)

Singles from Controller
- 1. "Weight of the World" Released: April 28, 2008; 2. "A Certain Death" Released: November 20, 2008

Professional ratings
Review scores
Source	Rating
AbsolutePunk	(88%)
Allmusic	3/5 stars
Rockmidgets	5/5 stars
Skylinepress	9/10

Controller is the third studio album by American-Canadian metalcore band Misery Signals, released on July 22, 2008. The album was recorded by producer Devin Townsend, who produced Misery Signals' debut record Of Malice and the Magnum Heart.

On April 28, 2008, Misery Signals released "Weight of the World" as the lead single. Bassist Kyle Johnson said, "It was the first song we recorded for the new album and it's a different song for us, it's little angrier, faster and actually the shortest song clocking in at a little over two minutes."

Vocalist Karl Schubach stated, "It was the first song we tracked and Devin Townsend had me run through the entire song once just to get down the idea of where I wanted to go. He told me that I nailed it right off the bat and we ended up keeping most of it as the finished version. The song itself is about deciding whether you should tell someone what you really think and get it off of your chest or take the high road and let them think that they are right. That situation can really blow up."

"A Certain Death" was released as the second single from the album. A music video for the song was directed by David Brodsky and starred Brandon Slagle in the narrative portions of the video.

== Track listing ==
All tracks are written by Misery Signals.

No.	Title	Length
1.	"Nothing"	4:05
2.	"Weight of the World"	2:50
3.	"Labyrinthian"	4:12
4.	"Parallels"	3:42
5.	"Coma"	4:51
6.	"A Certain Death"	3:25
7.	"Set in Motion"	3:48
8.	"Ebb and Flow"	3:27
9.	"Reset"	6:16
10.	"Homecoming"	5:09
Total length:		41:50

Japanese bonus track
No.	Title	Length
11.	"Ebb and Flow" (acoustic)	4:58
Total length:		46:48

== Personnel ==
Misery Signals

- Karl Schubach - lead vocals
- Ryan Morgan - lead guitar, backing vocals
- Stuart Ross - rhythm guitar
- Kyle Johnson - bass
- Branden Morgan - drums

Additional personnel

- Devin Townsend - producer
- Dean Maher - drum engineering
- Mike Young - drum editing
- Richard Morgan - additional percussion
- Sons of Nero - artwork
