= Someday (Parasol album) =

Studio album by Parasol
- Released: 17 July 2015
- Genre: Indie rock, indie pop
- Length: 36:44
- Label: DRDR AC

Parasol chronology
Parasol (2014)	Someday (2015)	A Nothing (2017)

Someday (Korean: 언젠가 그 날이 오면; RR: Eonjenga geunaree omyeon) is the debut album by South Korean indie rock band Parasol. The album was released on 17 July 2015.

== Background ==
Parasol released their self-title EP in 2014. Kim Na Eun said about the album as, "We did what we wanted to do with this album. Since it's our first studio album, we didn't want to have any will or meaning. we weren't conscious of the musical style either. we didn't think too much about it and expressed it indifferently."

== Critical reception ==
Jeong Goowon of Weiv described the album as "Pushing ahead with your own ambiguity is something you can never do without facing up to absurdity. In that sense, Someday has the most honest attitude of any work that came out this year." Jung Wooyoung of GQ Korea described the album as "In Someday, two interesting waves overlap and cross."

Publication	List	Rank	Ref.
Weiv	The best Korean albums of 2015	2	

== Track listing ==
No.	Title	Length
1.	"At the Court" ("법원에서")	3:29
2.	"The Bait" ("미끼")	4:57
3.	"Pretend" ("뭐 좀 한 것처럼")	3:27
4.	"Your Posture" ("너의 자세")	3:35
5.	"Sitting on a Broken Chair" ("부러진 의자에 앉아서")	3:30
6.	"Ant's Night" ("어느 거리에")	3:57
7.	"Billy" ("빌리")	4:37
8.	"Rotten Milk" ("친구")	6:43
9.	"Someday" ("언젠가 그 날이 오면")	2:29
