= Let's Do Nothing =

Studio album by The Freaks
- Released: September 9, 2011
- Genre: Indie rock
- Length: 43:46
- Label: Beatball

The Freaks chronology
| Let's Do Nothing (2011) | Move / On a Fine Day (2012) |

Let's Do Nothing (Korean: 그래, 아무것도 하지 말자; RR: Geurae amoogeotdo hajimalja) is the first and only studio album by South Korean indie rock band The Freaks. The album was released on 9 September 2011.

== Background ==
The Freaks is a band formed by old friends, and the album cover image is also a photo at a place in their hometown, Dunchon-dong. The band interviewed "We tend to record very slowly anyway, but it takes more time when we do an ensemble. of course we are not satisfied with the overall recording, but we are satisfied with the ensemble" about the record being recorded in the form of an ensemble.

== Critical reception ==
Professional ratings
Review scores
| Source | Rating |
|---|---|
| IZM | 3/5 stars |

Kim Doheon of IZM reviewed "The music of those who lost their independent direction of life and transferred the reality of young people to a drowsy guitar melody sadly still has strong persuasion." Lee Ijae of Indiepost described the album as "The helpless, depressing sensibilities and honest lyrics of youth, which are not as enjoyable as they are."

== Track listing ==
| No. | Title | Length |
|---|---|---|
| 1. | "Let's Do Nothing" ("청춘 만만세") | 3:30 |
| 2. | "Met My Grandmother While Walking Around" ("산책 중에 우연히 마주친 외할머니") | 3:06 |
| 3. | "Wet Eyeball" ("눈알에 눈물") | 3:35 |
| 4. | "We Together" ("우리 같이") | 4:07 |
| 5. | "Double-Bagger" ("메주") | 2:57 |
| 6. | "Burned" ("불구경") | 4:09 |
| 7. | "On a Fine Day" ("화창한 날에") | 4:48 |
| 8. | "Is It a Dream?" ("꿈이냐?") | 4:07 |
| 9. | "Sad, Oh Sad" ("슬프다 슬퍼") | 3:18 |
| 10. | "2000CC" | 3:50 |
| 11. | "Flower Party" ("꽃잔치") | 6:19 |
