= March (Deulgukhwa album) =

1985 studio album by the Deulgukhwa

Studio album by Deulgukhwa
- Released: September 10, 1985
- Venue: Seoul Studio
- Genre: Hard rock
- Length: 44:25
- Label: Seorabeol Records
- Producer: Deulgukhwa

Deulgukhwa chronology
| March (1985) | You and I (1986) |

March is the debut studio album of South Korean rock band Deulgukhwa, released on September 10, 1985, and reissued on CD in 1991. The album is considered to have opened the 'new music beginning of the 80's' and the 'renaissance of Korean pop music in the mid and late 80's'. It received 207 points from 45 selection committee members and ranked first in the Top 100 Korean Popular Music Albums selected by the Kyunghyang Shinmun in 2007. It is estimated to have sold about 1.8 million copies.

March is the band's only album to feature their original lineup, with guitarist Jo Deok-hwan leaving prior to their sophomore album.

== Production and recording ==
The album took about 1–2 months to record, with 24 tracks recorded as a multi-track recording. Cassettes were mainly used to compose songs. March is the first 16-channel recording in Korea. Joo Chan-kwon and Choi Goo-hee, who were active in a different band at the time, participated in the recording as session musicians. The two would officially become Deulgukhwa members with the release of their second album, You and I.

"March" was written and composed by Jeon In-kwon and arranged by Choi Seong-won and Huh Seong-wook. Jeon In-kwon, the producer, urged him to compose at the very end, and said, "It's not music, it's an album made with hard work." Choi Seongwon composed "That's Only My World", which was created before the album was produced; "Everyday With You", which expressed his feelings while in and immediately after being discharged from the military; and "No More To Me". A year prior, the songs were featured in the compilation Our Song Exhibition I by Jeon In-kwon and Kang In-won, a year before the release of March.

Cho Deok-hwan composed "Train to the World", "Until the Morning Rises", and "Bless You". "Train to the World" was made two months before the release of the album, and it expresses the mind of a young man waiting for the 1988 Seoul Olympics. He said that "Until the Morning Comes" contains "a desire for an ideal image of a woman because the concept of the content is a man's song". "Congratulations" expresses the emotion of sending his older brother away as a diplomat or consul when he was in his 20s.

Instead of inserting a geonjeon gayo (건전가요; lit. 'wholesome songs'), which were normally included at the end of albums released at the time, the band sang "Our Wish" a cappella. The song was not included on the album's 1991 reissue CD.

== Cover ==
The front of the cover is a homage to Let it Be, the last studio album of the Beatles. In 2003, Choi Seong-won, in answer to a question asking if his relationship with Jeon In-kwon was similar to Lennon-McCartney, said that this was made from Jeon In-kwon's idea.

There is no choice but to be different from the real story on the outside. Comparisons with Lennon and McCartney are just comparisons. However, it is true that John Lennon was originally liked by (former) In Kwon, and I liked Paul McCartney. It was (Jeon) In Kwon's idea that the covers of the 1st album were made like the Beatles' Let It Be.

However, in an interview with IZM in 2011, Jo Deok-hwan said that he did not have Let It Be in mind.

We just went to Samcheong-dong and took 4 photographers, and it came out that way (laughs), nothing like that was intentional. As far as I know, at that time, bands were generally composed of 4 people, and there were many albums like that. It wasn't aimed at Let It Be, but the public thinks so.

== Reception and legacy ==
Professional ratings
Review scores
| Source | Rating |
|---|---|
| Wave | 10/10 stars |
| IZM | (alum) |

March has received critical acclaim over the years. Hwang Jeong-eun of Serve magazine said about the album, "Jeon In-kwon's screams in "That's My World", Choi Seong-won's emotional voice in "Everyday With You", Huh Seong-wook's restrained keyboard, and Jo Deok-hwan's song writing in "Until the Morning Rises", as well as the best session men at the time, such as Choi Gu-hee, Joo Chan-kwon, Lee Won-jae—all of these things show how thoroughly this album was made with the sensibility of live for live with the senses and capabilities of a singer-songwriter."

Imjinmo of IZM praised the album, saying, "The album revealed the revival of Korean rock. At the same time, it was a sign of victory for a local band and a confirmation of the possibility of non-mainstream music. It is a work that should be placed at the top of legends." Critic Choi Ji-ho wrote, "Not only Deulgukhwa but any musician after them. The Korean popular music renaissance of the late 80's may have been signaled that it was the start of this album." Lee Yong-woo of popular music webzine Wave said, "This album is a masterpiece that has all the artistry that a studio album can have, such as composition, arrangement, performance, and recording, as befits the evaluation as one of the best albums in Korean popular music." He gave it a rating of 10 out of 10.

March is considered to have taken Korean rock music to the next level and also acted as a catalyst that exploded the underground. Naver's Korean Popular Songs Album 6000 said, "After the release of Deulgukhwa's 1st album, numerous musicians called today's masters appeared one after another as if they were hiding somewhere and popped out. They released albums with diversity and completeness. While doing so, the 'Renaissance of Korean popular music', in which mainstream hit songs and author-oriented album music coexisted, opened. If you include artistic quality and musical ripple effect, Deulgukhwa's 1st album can be regarded as the beginning of new rock music in the 1980s".

In 2023, "That's My World" was included on Rolling Stone's "100 Greatest Songs in the History of Korean Pop Music" as #47.

== Track listing ==
Side A
| No. | Title | Writer(s) | Length |
|---|---|---|---|
| 1. | "Marching" | Jeon In-kwon | 5:09 |
| 2. | "That's My World" | Choi Seong-won | 5:30 |
| 3. | "Train to the World" | Jo Deok-hwan | 3:18 |
| 4. | "No More to Me" | Choi Seong-won | 3:49 |
| 5. | "Bless You" | Jo Deok-hwan | 4:19 |
| Total length: | | | 22:08 |

Side B
| No. | Title | Writer(s) | Length |
|---|---|---|---|
| 1. | "Just Love" | Choi Seong-won | 5:27 |
| 2. | "Everyday With You" | Choi Seong-won | 5:30 |
| 3. | "A Sunday Only Had Afternoon" | Lee Byung-woo | 3:18 |
| 4. | "Until the Morning Rises" | Jo Deok-hwan | 3:49 |
| 5. | "Our Wish" (hidden track) | | 1:50 |
| Total length: | | | 22:17 |

== Personnel ==
Deulgukhwa

- Jeon In-kwon – vocals, acoustic guitar
- Choi Seong-won – Vocals, Bass, Acoustic Guitar, Synthesizer
- Jo Deok-hwan – vocals, guitar, acoustic guitar
- Heo Seong-wook – piano, synthesizer

Additional musicians

- Joo Chan-kwon – Drums
- Choi Goo-hee – Guitar
- Lee Won-jae – clarinet

Production

- Young Kim – Producer
- Choi Se-young – Recording Engineer
- Kim Woo-hwan – Cover art
- Lee Je Rak – Cover Design
- Kim Jeong-soo – Cover photos
