= Mirrors (Misery Signals album) =

Studio album by Misery Signals
- Released: August 22, 2006
- Recorded: 2006
- Genre: Progressive metalcore
- Length: 49:27
- Label: Ferret
- Producer: Ben Schigel

Misery Signals chronology
Of Malice and the Magnum Heart (2004)	Mirrors (2006)	Controller (2008)

Singles from Mirrors
- 1. "The Failsafe" Released: August 20, 2006

Professional ratings
Review scores
Source	Rating
AbsolutePunk	(94%)
Allmusic	3.5/5 stars
Blabbermouth	8/10
Lambgoat	6/10
Punknews	2.5/5 stars

Mirrors is the second full-length album by American-Canadian metalcore band Misery Signals. It was released through Ferret Records on August 22, 2006. It is the first album to feature new vocalist Karl Schubach, who joined the band after previous vocalist Jesse Zaraska left.

== Overview ==
During touring for the band's debut album, Of Malice and the Magnum Heart, tension started to form between vocalist Jesse Zaraska and the other members. Once touring for the album was completed, Zaraska was asked to leave the band. Zaraska would return to Edmonton and form the post-rock band Sleeping Girl with members of his former band Compromise. He would be replaced by Karl Schubach. Schubach was chosen after the band posted an instrumental song online, inviting fans to write lyrics and perform vocals for the song.

The chorus of "One Day I'll Stay Home" features guest vocals from Patrick Stump of Fall Out Boy.

== Track listing ==
All tracks are written by Misery Signals

No.	Title	Length
1.	"Face Yourself"	4:51
2.	"The Failsafe"	5:21
3.	"Post Collapse"	3:59
4.	"Migrate"	2:29
5.	"One Day I'll Stay Home" (featuring Patrick Stump)	4:05
6.	"Something Was Always Missing, But It Was Never You"	4:01
7.	"Reverence Lost"	3:45
8.	"Sword of Eyes"	5:15
9.	"An Offering to the Insatiable Sons of God (Butcher)"	4:19
10.	"Anchor"	3:38
11.	"Mirrors"	7:44
Total length:		49:27

== Personnel ==
Misery Signals

- Karl Schubach – lead vocals
- Ryan Morgan – lead guitar, backing vocals
- Stuart Ross – rhythm guitar
- Kyle Johnson – bass
- Branden Morgan – drums

Additional

- Patrick Stump – clean vocals on "One Day I'll Stay Home"
- Ben Schigel – producer, engineer, mixing
- Sons of Nero – artwork
- Ryan Russell – photographs
