= Somedays =

Somedays or Some Days may refer to:

- Somedays (song), by Sonny Fodera, Jazzy and D.O.D.
- "Somedays", a song by Audioslave from Revelations, 2006
- "Somedays", a song by Lostprophets from Weapons, 2012
- "Somedays", a song by Meredith Brooks from Blurring the Edges, 1997
- "Somedays", a song by Paul McCartney from Flaming Pie, 1997
- "Somedays (I Don't Feel Like Trying)", a song by the Raconteurs from Help Us Stranger, 2019
- Some Days, an album by Dennis Lloyd, 2021

== See also ==
- Someday (disambiguation)
