= Misery Signals =

American-Canadian metalcore band (2002–2024)

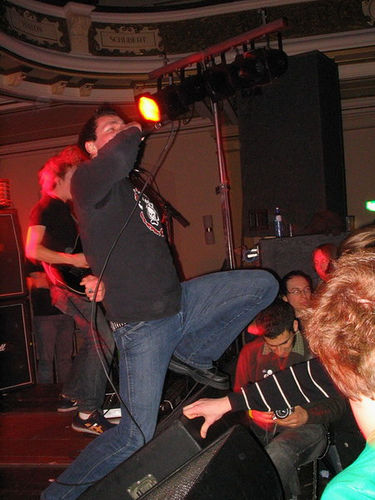
- Misery Signals performing live in 2005

Background information
- Origin: Madison, Wisconsin, U.S. Edmonton, Alberta, Canada
- Genres: Metalcore, progressive metalcore
- Years active: 2002–2024
- Labels: Ferret, Basick
- Spinoffs: Burning Empires
- Spinoff of: 7 Angels 7 Plagues
- Past members: Jesse Zaraska; Ryan Morgan; Branden Morgan; Stuart Ross; Kyle Johnson; Karl Schubach; Jeff Aust; Gregory Thomas; Kent Wren
- Website: miserysignalsmusic.com

Misery Signals was an American-Canadian metalcore band formed in Wisconsin in 2002.

== History ==
=== Formation (2002–2003) ===
Misery Signals was formed after the disbanding of several bands, including 7 Angels 7 Plagues, Hamartia, and Compromise. Having played briefly with 7 Angels 7 Plagues, former Compromise vocalist, Jesse Zaraska, was approached by Ryan Morgan and Kyle Johnson for a new project which would become Misery Signals. Jeff Aust from Hamartia joined on as second guitar and Ryan Morgan's brother Branden joined as the band's drummer. Aust soon left the band and has since gone on to join With Honor. He was replaced by Stu Ross, a friend of Jesse Zaraska's from St. Albert, Alberta.

In 2003 the band released its eponymous debut EP. The EP was dedicated to the memory of Jordan Wodehouse and Daniel Langlois, who were killed by a drunk driver on Interstate 20 near Heflin, Alabama while on tour with their band Compromise in support of 7 Angels 7 Plagues.

=== Ferret Music (2004–2009) ===
The band eventually signed to New Jersey's Ferret Music, releasing their first full-length album, Of Malice and the Magnum Heart. After extensive touring resulting in friction between Zaraska and band members, Zaraska was asked to leave. The band began auditioning vocalists via Myspace, announcing Karl Schubach as Zaraska's replacement with whom they recorded the album, Mirrors.

In July 2008, Misery Signals released their third full-length entitled Controller. After extensive touring in support of Controller in early 2009, members of Misery Signals wanted to pursue other musical directions outside of their band.

=== Side projects (2009–2010) ===
Schubach is involved in a heavy metal side project called Solace. He is the sole member of the band, recording guitar, bass and vocals in a D.I.Y.-fashioned home studio. The drums are added in digitally, through the use of a program on his MacBook. During the funding stages of this side project he provided incentives to individuals and bands in return for financial support using crowd funding platform Kickstarter. As part of this incentive scheme Karl Schubach provided guest vocals on a song by UK metal/hardcore band The Divided. Schubach also contributed guest vocals to the track "Isolated (Built on Misery)" on the 2014 album Consequences by the Australian band The Rose Line.

Hardcore/punk band Burning Empires consists of members from Misery Signals, Fall Out Boy and 7 Angels 7 Plagues, with vocalist Ryan Morgan, bassist Kyle Johnson, guitarists Stu Ross and Matthew Mixon, and drummer Andy Hurley. The quintet also owns a clothing line / record label called Fuck City.

Milwaukee-based punk/post-hardcore band Lowtalker consists of Branden Morgan and Stuart Ross of Misery Signals. They team up with Casey Hjelmberg and Matt Keil of Comeback Kid to complete the four-piece project. Lowtalker released their EP People Worry About Everything in the spring of 2010 through FC records.

In 2010, Stuart Ross became the frontman of a Vancouver, B.C. pop-punk band Living with Lions. Ross officially left Misery Signals on September 25, 2010, to put his focus on Living with Lions, and was reportedly tired of performing heavy metal. In October 2010, Kyle Johnson also announced his departure from the band.

=== Absent Light (2011–2015) ===
After an extended period of inactivity with a heavy focus on side projects, Misery Signals made an official statement about the state of the band in November 2010. The press release addressed the loss of Ross and Johnson, and also announced that the band had not, in fact, broken up. Ryan Morgan commented that, "In the next few months, we'll group back up and return." On maintaining the continuity of the band's style and keeping the same name, Morgan said, "Stu and Kyle made awesome contributions, but the trajectory of the band remains the same in their absence. If the time came that our sound took a drastically different course, then it wouldn't be Misery Signals anymore, and we wouldn't pretend that it was."

The first new release from Misery Signals after going through this major line up change was a cover of Pink Floyd's song "Us and Them" from the 1973 album The Dark Side of the Moon. The song was contributed to a soundtrack for the video game Homefront, which was released free of charge for digital download on March 22, 2011.

In April 2011, Karl Schubach posted a couple tweets mentioning band practice, writing new material in June, and said "We're focusing on bringing the new guys up to speed at the moment." The new lineup was finalized and appeared on the Crush Em All tour fall 2011. In early 2012 the band stated that they were working on new material for the new album. Lead singer Karl Schubach stated in an interview "I think every band aims to progress with each album they write. But sometimes progression is learning what worked really well the previous records and incorporating those elements. So far these new songs feel like a purposeful blend of our most recent, more structured Controller record mixed with the chaos and spontaneity of the earlier Of Malice and the Magnum Heart." All of the members reunited in the studio the recording the new album, and started an Indiegogo fundraiser to help pay for the recording, marketing, and pressing of the new album, as the band is currently signed to Basick Records.

On July 23, 2013, Misery Signals released Absent Light, with the first single "Luminary" being released twenty days earlier.

On May 30, 2014, news surfaced that Misery Signals announced plans to commemorate the tenth anniversary of their 'Of Malice and the Magnum Heart' album with the "Malice X Tour" later that year. The tour featured the band's original lineup, which consisted of Jesse Zaraska (vocals), Ryan Morgan (lead guitar), Stu Ross (rhythm guitar), Kyle Johnson (bass), and Branden Morgan (drums), and Misery Signals performed the album in its entirety.

=== Ultraviolet (2016–2024) ===
On October 19, 2016, rumours of an original lineup reunion tour and album were confirmed by vocalist Jesse Zaraska. When reached for comment by Nic Huber of Metal Injection, Zaraska had the following to say: "It is the truth, sir. We are in the midst of writing new material together and will be playing some show over the coming year. It has been very cool thus far. We will definitely be doing a proper US tour in 2017."

On March 24, 2018, at the event Midwest Meltdown in Iowa City, Iowa; Misery Signals frontman Jesse Zaraska, announced the band had been holed up in Boise, Idaho over the previous few weeks. He stated that they are, indeed, working on a new album. Zaraska stated on stage, that he believes their newest album "will be the BEST Misery Signals album yet." When asked about the style of the new album, Zaraska replied "It will probably be a lot like Of Malice."

On the "Death to False Metalcore Tour 2019" with Darkest Hour and Unearth, the band played a song titled "Sunlifter" from their Absent Light B-Side vinyl release. Zaraska also stated November 2019 as the release date for their new album.

On May 14, 2020, Misery Signals announced their upcoming fifth studio album, Ultraviolet, to be released on August 7, 2020, along with the release of the single "The Tempest"

To commemorate its 20th anniversary, Misery Signals' 2003 self-titled debut EP was re-released in 2023, for the first time ever on vinyl.

On April 2, 2024, Misery Signals announced they would be breaking up in late-2024 and embarking on one final tour with both current vocalist Jesse Zaraska and former vocalist Karl Schubach performing with the band. The final show took place on October 19.

== Musical style ==
Misery Signals are melodic metalcore. They also employ elements of math rock and post-rock, such as time signature changes.

== Band members ==
Final lineup

- Ryan Morgan – lead guitar, backing vocals (2002–2024)
- Branden Morgan – drums (2002–2024) (Lightyrs)
- Jesse Zaraska – vocals (2002–2006, 2014–2024)
- Stu Ross – rhythm guitar, backing vocals (2002–2010, 2014–2024) (Comeback Kid)
- Kyle Johnson – bass guitar (2002–2010, 2013–2024)

Former

- Karl Schubach – vocals (2006–2014, 2024 live only) (Solace)
- Jeff Aust – rhythm guitar (2002)
- Gregory Thomas – rhythm guitar, backing vocals (2011–2014) (End)
- Kent Wren – bass guitar (2011–2013)

Timeline

== Discography ==
Studio albums

- Of Malice and the Magnum Heart (2004)
- Mirrors (2006)
- Controller (2008)
- Absent Light (2013)
- Ultraviolet (2020)

EPs

- Misery Signals (2003)
- Sunlifter b/w Like Yesterday (2016)

DVDs

- Yesterday Was Everything (2016)

Live albums

- Live in Isolation (2023)
