= The Freaks (band) =

South Korean rock band

- Origin: Seoul, South Korea
- Genres: Indie rock
- Years active: 2009-2013
- Label: Beatball
- Past members: Jeong Wonjin; Song Siho; Yoo Wanmoo; Lee Gyeonghwan

The Freaks (Korean: 얄개들; RR: Yalgaedeul) is a South Korean indie rock band. The band formed in 2009 and disbanded in 2013. They released a studio album Let's Do Nothing (그래, 아무것도 하지 말자) in 2011. Despite their only four years of activities, they were considered one of the representative bands of the Hongdae indie scene, and since their disbandment, the members have been members of Parasol, Bluestream, and Bamshinsa.

== Career ==
The Freaks was formed in 2009. All the members are local friends from Dunchon-dong, and they have wanted to form a band before, but the members' military service delayed their formation. They gained popularity as they performed at the 2009 Indie Music Festival. After signing with Beatball Music, they released their single Is It a Dream? (꿈이냐?).

Their first studio album Let's Do Nothing (그래, 아무것도 하지 말자) was released in 2011. Kim Doheon of IZM described the album as "The music of those who lost their independent direction of life and transferred the reality of young people to a drowsy guitar melody sadly still has strong persuasion." They interviewed that they were recording their second album in 2012, They performed in "Youth: Dreaming of a Happy Day, Lee Hyangik (청춘 : 즐거운 날을 꿈꾸고 있는 더 핀 이향익)" for the recovery of Lee Hyangik, a member of The Finnn who was in a coma due to a car accident. In 2013, they suddenly announced the breakup. The members Yoo Wanmoo and Lee Gyeonghwan have been active as band Bluestream, Jeong Wonjin has joined Parasol as a member, and Song Siho has formed his own band Bam Shinsa.

== Discography ==
=== Albums ===
- Let's Do Nothing (그래, 아무것도 하지 말자) (2011)

=== EPs ===
- Move / On a Fine Day (이사 / 화창한 날에) (2012)
