= Kang San-eh =

South Korean folk rock singer-songwriter (born 1963)

- Born: Kang Yeong-geol; November 3, 1963 (age 62); Busan, South Korea
- Genres: Folk rock
- Occupation: Singer-songwriter
- Years active: 1992–present
- Labels: DRDR AC

Korean name
- Hangul: 강영걸
- RR: Gang Yeonggeol
- MR: Kang Yŏnggŏl

Stage name
- Hangul: 강산에
- RR: Gang Sane
- MR: Kang Sane

Kang San-eh (Korean: 강산에; born Kang Yeong-geol (강영걸); November 3, 1963) is a South Korean folk rock singer-songwriter and actor. He is sometimes referred to as the "Korean Bob Dylan."

== Early life and education ==
Kang was born in 1963 in Busan, South Korea. His mother had settled there during the Korean War as part of the Hungnam evacuation from North Korea in 1950. Kang has one brother and one sister.

Kang moved to Seoul in 1982 to study traditional Korean medicine at Kyung Hee University.

== Career ==
Kang made his debut with the album Ra-gu-yo in 1993. He achieved greater success with his second album, You Can Do It, released in 1994. Since his third album, Ppittagi in 1996, he has worked with Japanese guitarist Gasga Hirohumihachi.

He had a performance for 6 days which is titled "Let's go on a picnic to the riverside and mountains" at a small theater in Daehakro, a famous spot in Seoul. Hachi and Natil, who performed percussion instruments, joined the concert with him. Recordings of the performance were put on the album "Let's go on a picnic Best Live".

He sang the single "To My Friend" (친구여) in collaboration with Bobby Kim.

Kang also sang the song "How Nice It Would Be" (얼마나 좋을까) for the 2014 Korean drama "Valid Love" starring Uhm Tae-woong, Lee Si-young and Lee Soo-hyuk.

In 2018, he sang at the 'Spring is Coming' Inter-Korean Musical Exchange in Pyongyang, North Korea. It was the first time in more than a decade that the two Koreas had hosted a significant event. Kang became emotional during his performance, stating his parents were refugees from the North, and that his concert in Pyongyang was personal.

== Discography ==
=== Studio albums ===
- 1992: Gangsan-e Vol. 0
- 1994: Me at the Puberty
- 1996: Ppittagi
- 1998: Salmon
- 2002: Kang Young-geul Vol.6
- 2008: Wet towel

=== Compilation albums ===
- 1997: The Essence
- 1999: A morning, Remake Album
- 2001: Best Live

=== EPs ===
- 2011: Kiss

=== OSTs ===
- 2014: "How Nice It Would Be" for the Valid Love Soundtrack
- 2015: "Walk slowly" for the Late Night Restaurant Soundtrack
- 2016: "Today" for the My Horrible Boss Soundtrack

== Videography ==
=== Movies ===
- 1994: To You from Me - at music section
- 2005: Shout of Asia - starring
- 2011: Battlefield Heroes - at music team
- 2011: Pink - as Bang Rang Gaek / wanderer
- 2013: El Condor Pasa - at music section
- 2016: Night Song - as a live singer (friendship appearance)
- 2016: A Quiet Dream - as Fortune Teller (special appearance)
- 2016: Beaten Black and Blue - cameo (friendship appearance)

=== TV shows ===
- 2004: Happy Sunday - as the 48th teacher of the 183 time immortal song
