= Burning Empires (band) =

American band (2009–2010)

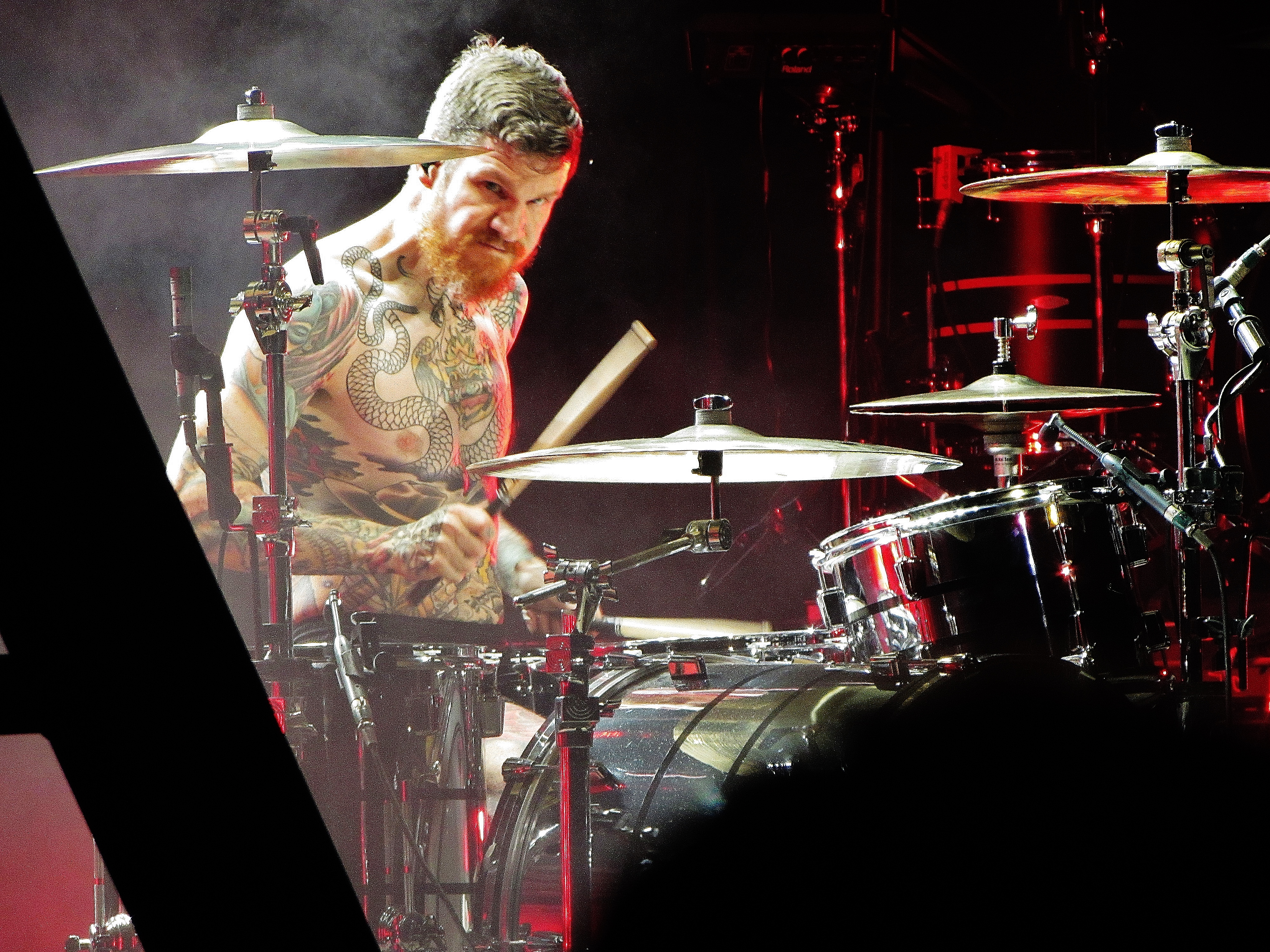
- Drummer Andy Hurley

Background information
- Origin: Milwaukee, Wisconsin, U.S.
- Genres: Hardcore punk
- Years active: 2009–2010
- Spinoff of: Misery Signals; 7 Angels 7 Plagues; Castahead; Fall Out Boy; Racetraitor; Arma Angelus
- Past members: Matt Mixon; Ryan Morgan; Stuart Ross; Kyle Johnson; Andy Hurley

Burning Empires was an American hardcore punk supergroup formed in 2009 in Milwaukee, Wisconsin, consisting of members of Misery Signals, 7 Angels 7 Plagues and Fall Out Boy. They have released two EPs, in 2009 and 2010, respectively, as well as having opened for The Amity Affliction on their 2010 Australian tour.

== Musical style ==
Burning Empires were categorized as hardcore punk and compared to work of Darkest Hour, as well as multiple of the member's other band, Misery Signals. In an interview, Ross stated that "musically I wanted to do a band in relation to Misery Signals, a more punky hardcore version of what we were doing influenced by bands like Propaghandi, Comeback Kid and Cursed" and "I find this group is more socially charged than what we’ve done in Misery Signals. A lot of my lyrics up to this point on the Burning Empires material is anti-civilization", in addition to Spin Magazine describing the band as "(ripping) out a heavy, furious sound with thundering double kick drums, screeching electric guitars, and Morgan’s vicious screams".

== Members ==
- Matt Mixon – guitar
- Ryan Morgan – lead vocals
- Stuart Ross – guitar
- Kyle Johnson – bass
- Andy Hurley – drums

== Discography ==
- Burning Empires (2009)
- Heirs of the Soil (2010)
