= Until the Day Breathes and the Shadows Flee =

- Cover art for the 2003 reissue

EP by 7 Angels 7 Plagues
- Released: June 17, 2000; March 25, 2003 (reissue)
- Recorded: 2000
- Genre: Metalcore
- Length: 21:35
- Label: Uprising Records (reissue)

7 Angels 7 Plagues chronology
Until the Day Breathes and the Shadows Flee (2000)	Jhazmyne's Lullaby (2001)

Professional ratings
Review scores
Source	Rating
Allmusic	4/5 stars

Until the Day Breathes and the Shadows Flee was the first EP released by Milwaukee hardcore outfit 7 Angels 7 Plagues. Originally self-released in 2000, in 2003 it was remastered and re-released by Uprising Records. This recording contains early versions of; "A Farewell to a Perfect Score", "Dandelion", and "Silent Deaths, Crowded Lives". Featuring long arpeggiated intro's on the former and latter, and notably rougher guitar distortion. Temo Rios contributed vocals for this release. The instrumental "Until the Day Breathes and the Shadows Flee" and "Sweet Princess Thief" were not re-recorded but used as interludes through the final dates of their reunion tour. Their original self-released demo is highly sought and very rare. There is a difference between the instrumental versions of "Until the Day Breathes and the Shadows Flee".

== Track listing ==
All tracks are written by 7 Angels 7 Plagues.

No.	Title	Length
1.	"Silent Deaths, Crowded Lives"	5:08
2.	"Dandelion"	3:35
3.	"Sweet Princess Thief"	4:06
4.	"Until the Day Breathes and the Shadows Flee"	3:07
5.	"A Farewell to a Perfect Score"	5:44

== Personnel ==
7 Angels 7 Plagues

- Kyle Johnson - Bass
- Jared Logan - Drums and percussion
- Matt Matera - Guitar
- Ryan Morgan - Guitar
- Temo Rios - Vocals

Production

- Will just - recording
- Bill Stace - mastering
- Alan Douches - remastering
