= Of Malice and the Magnum Heart =

Studio album by Misery Signals
- Released: June 1, 2004
- Studios: Greenhouse Studios, Vancouver
- Genre: Progressive metalcore
- Length: 43:04
- Label: Ferret
- Producer: Devin Townsend

Misery Signals chronology
Misery Signals (2003)	Of Malice and the Magnum Heart (2004)	Mirrors (2006)

Of Malice and the Magnum Heart is the debut full-length album by American-Canadian metalcore band Misery Signals. It was released through Ferret Records on June 1, 2004. The album was produced by Devin Townsend of Strapping Young Lad.

This is the band's last album with original vocalist Jesse Zaraska until 2020's Ultraviolet.

== Background ==
Misery Signals was formed in 2002 by Jesse Zaraska (vocals), Ryan Morgan (lead guitar, backing vocals), Jeff Aust (rhythm guitar), Kyle Johnson (bass guitar), and Branden Morgan (drums) after the dissolution of the bands 7 Angels 7 Plagues, Compromise, and Hamartia. Aust would leave the band shortly after its formation and was replaced by Stu Ross. The band recorded a six-song self-titled EP that was released in 2003 through State of the Art Recordings. The EP featured the original version of the song "The Year Summer Ended in June" and was re-recorded for Of Malice and the Magnum Heart; the EP and song are dedicated to the memory of Jordan Wodehouse and Daniel Langlois, who were killed by a drunk driver on Interstate 20 near Heflin, Alabama while on tour with their band Compromise in support of 7 Angels 7 Plagues.

Matthew Mixon, formerly of 7 Angels 7 Plagues, provides additional vocals on the songs "The Stinging Rain," "Murder," and "Five Years."

== Reception and legacy ==
Professional ratings
Review scores
Source	Rating
Exclaim!	Positive
Lambgoat	8/10
Punknews	4.5/5 stars

Of Malice and the Magnum Heart has received critical acclaim since its release, and has been considered a landmark in the metalcore genre.

Elliot of Punknews gave the album a 4.5/5, praising Jesse Zaraska's vocals and lyrics for being emotional and poetic, especially on "The Year Summer Ended in June." The review also praised the band's use of complex time signatures, the guitar work of Ryan Morgan and Stu Ross, and the album's experimentation, highlighting the instrumental "Worlds & Dreams." Graham Landers of Lambgoat also praised the album, highlighting Townsend's production as well as the band's "amalgamation of melodic metal and hardcore." Landers did criticize the use of spoken word vocals, saying "the spoken elements on this record seem strangely forced and out-of-place more times then [sic] not (even more so than their debut EP)."

A slightly less positive review came from Jill Mikkelson of Exclaim!. Mikkelson said the album's more melodic parts sounded similar to Hopesfall at times and that "many of the talking parts seem out of place and are often comprised of awkward poetry." However, Mikkelson also stated the album is "a fairly solid record with knowledgeable songwriting and amazing production."

In 2018, New Fury Media called the album a "modern-day classic," citing Devin Townsend's production for having a "clear, yet raw and slightly unpolished feeling," Zaraska's passionate vocals, and the song "The Year Summer Ended in June" for being "emotionally devastating." The album was included in Brooklyn Vegan's 2021 list of "15 Seminal Albums from Metalcore's Second Wave (2000-2010)."

To celebrate the album's 10th anniversary, the band's original line–up reunited for the Malice X tour in August 2014.

== Track listing ==
All tracks are written by Misery Signals.

No.	Title	Length
1.	"A Victim, a Target" (featuring Devin Townsend)	1:51
2.	"In Response to Stars"	3:40
3.	"The Year Summer Ended in June"	4:25
4.	"In Summary of What I Am"	4:29
5.	"The Stinging Rain" (featuring Matthew Mixon)	5:00
6.	"Worlds & Dreams" (instrumental)	3:40
7.	"Murder" (featuring Matthew Mixon)	4:21
8.	"On Account of an Absence"	3:08
9.	"Five Years" (featuring Matthew Mixon)	5:55
10.	"Difference of Vengeance and Wrongs" (featuring Byron Jay Ellis)	6:35
Total length:		43:04

== Personnel ==
Credits adapted from AllMusic:

Misery Signals

- Jesse Zaraska – lead vocals
- Ryan Morgan – lead guitar, backing vocals
- Stuart Ross – rhythm guitar, backing vocals
- Kyle Johnson – bass
- Branden Morgan – drums

Additional personnel

- Devin Townsend – producer, additional vocals on "A Victim, A Target"
- Shawn Thingvold – engineer, mastering, mixing
- Greg Reely – mastering
- Scott Cooke – engineer
- Matthew Mixon – additional vocals on "The Stinging Rain", "Murder" and "Five Years"
- Byron Jay Ellis – clean vocals on "Difference of Vengeance and Wrongs"
- Tom Bejgrowicz – art direction, concept, design, layout design
- Travis Smith – illustrations
