= Parasol (band) =

South Korean indie rock band

- Origin: Seoul, South Korea
- Genres: Indie rock; indie pop; dream pop
- Years active: 2013-present
- Labels: DRDR AC
- Members: Kim Na Eun; Chiyoonhae; Jeong Wonjin

Parasol (Korean: 파라솔) is a South Korean indie rock band. The band currently consists of Kim Na Eun, Chiyoonhae and Jeong Wonjin. Since their formation in 2013, the band has released two studio albums Someday (언젠가 그 날이 오면) (2015) and A Nothing (아무것도 아닌 사람) (2017).

== Career ==
Parasol was formed in 2013. Chiyoonhae is a member of Sultan of the Disco, Kim Na Eun was a member of Trampauline and Julia Hart, and Jeong Wonjin was a member of The Freaks and Bluestream. They released their self-title EP in 2014

In 2015, the band released their first studio album Someday (언젠가 그 날이 오면). Kim Na Eun interviewed the album as "It's an album that does not have any meaning, and we recorded it just as much as we want." Jeong Goowon of Weiv described the album as "The best pleasure that ambiguity and subtlety can convey."

They released their single Pillow and Ceiling (베개와 천장) in 2016 In 2017, they released a single with Silica Gel Space Angel. Music Y's Jeong Byeongwook reviewed their collaboration as "Like the abstraction of half-dreaming in the lyrics of the song, the moment of "complete" opens at an unexpected moment." In July, they released their second studio album A Nothing (아무것도 아닌 사람), and they had South Korean and Japanese tour during August and September. In 2018, they performed with Silica Gel on The EBS space. In 2019, Kim Na Eun began her solo musician career with the single Summer Clouds.

== Discography ==
=== Studio albums ===
- Someday (언젠가 그 날이 오면) (2015)
- A Nothing (아무것도 아닌 사람) (2017)

=== EPs ===
- Parasol (파라솔) (2014)
- Wednesday (수요일) (2017)
