= Jhazmyne's Lullaby =

- The cover art is a nod to some of Miles Davis' album covers.

Studio album by 7 Angels 7 Plagues
- Released: September 18, 2001
- Recorded: 2001
- Studios: Bionic Studios (Milwaukee, Wisconsin); Mirimar Theatre (Milwaukee, Wisconsin)
- Genres: Metalcore, post-hardcore, mathcore
- Length: 37:43
- Label: Uprising
- Producers: 7 Angels 7 Plagues, Chin

7 Angels 7 Plagues chronology
| Until the Day Breathes and the Shadows Flee (2000) | Jhazmyne's Lullaby (2001) |

Professional ratings
Review scores
| Source | Rating |
|---|---|
| AllMusic | 4/5 stars |
| Chronicles of Chaos | 9/10 stars |
| Exclaim! | favorable |
| Lamb Goat | 7/10 stars |

Jhazmyne's Lullaby is the only studio album by American metalcore band 7 Angels 7 Plagues.

== Reception ==
According to AllMusic, Jhazmyne's Lullaby is a "powerful metalcore album that finds strength in solid lyrical content." In his review of the album, writer Kevin Stewart-Panko said the band "construct songs that hardcore kids will hurt themselves to without realising how much of a jazz influence goes into 7A7P's style and graphic design. They beat down the restrictive walls of what can go onto a hardcore record with the inclusion of piano études and acoustic guitar solos."

== Track listing ==
All music written and performed by 7 Angels 7 Plagues, except where noted.

| No. | Title | Writer(s) | Length |
|---|---|---|---|
| 1. | "A Farewell to a Perfect Score" | | 4:49 |
| 2. | "Someday" | | 4:09 |
| 3. | "The Commentator's Despair" | | 5:13 |
| 4. | "The Afternoon" (instrumental) | Matt Matera | 1:27 |
| 5. | "Away with Words" | | 4:27 |
| 6. | "Dandelion" | | 3:33 |
| 7. | "Arcadia Fades (Jhazmyne's Lullaby Pt. II)" | | 4:25 |
| 8. | "Silent Deaths, Crowded Lives" | | 4:58 |
| 9. | "Jhazmyne's Lullaby" (instrumental) | Jared Logan | 4:42 |
| Total length: | | | 37:43 |

== Personnel ==
7 Angels 7 Plagues

- Kyle Johnson - bass
- Jared Logan - drums, percussion
- Matt Matera - guitar
- Matt Mixon - vocals
- Ryan Morgan - guitar

Production and recording

- Produced by 7 Angels 7 Plagues and CHIN for CHINCORE Productions
- Songs 1-8 engineered by CHIN at Bionic Studios in Milwaukee, WI
- Song 9 engineered by Jared Logan at the Mirimar Theatre in Milwaukee, WI
- Assistant Engineers: Jared Logan and DJ Malcomb
- Mastered by Trevor Sadler at Mastermind Productions, Milwaukee, WI

Artwork and design

- Art direction & design: Martin Defatte for Guerrilla Digital
- Photography: Nate Baker @ minno9.com, Brian Dally, & Martin Defatte
