= Deulgukhwa =

South Korean folk rock band

- Deulgukhwa in 1985. From left: Heo Seong-wook, Choi Seong-won, Jeon In-kwon, and Jo Deok-hwan

Background information
- Origin: Seoul, South Korea
- Genres: Rock; Folk rock; Soft rock
- Years active: 1982–1989; 1995–1999; 2012–2013
- Label: Seoul Records
- Past members: Jeon In-kwon; Choi Seong-won; Heo Seong-wook; Jo Deok-hwan; Joo Chan-gwon; Choi Goo-hee; Son Jin-tae; Min Jae-hyun; Lee Gun-tae

Deulgukhwa (Korean: 들국화; lit. 'Wild Chrysanthemum') was a South Korean rock band formed in 1982 by Jeon In-kwon, Choi Seong-won, Heo Seong-wook, and Jo Deok-hwan. They are considered one of the best rock groups in Korea in the 80s and 90s, often being referred to as "Korea's Beatles."

In September 1985, they released their first album March, which included hits "That's My World" and "March". After the failure of their second album, Deulgukhwa disbanded due to creative differences among the members.

In the 1980s, under the military regime, the mainstream popular music world, which was dominated by soft ballads and trots, presented Korean-style rock with rebellious lyrics and screaming vocals by Jeon In-kwon. In addition, their music became known through albums and live performances, rather than broadcasting, which was the main distribution channel for popular music at the time, and gained a huge resonance, opening the possibility of underground music for the first time in Korea. Their debut album, March, became a hot topic again in 2007 when it ranked first in the Top 100 Korean Popular Music Albums selected by the Kyunghyang Shinmun.

== History ==
The band formed in August 1982 when Jeon In-kwon (vocalist), Heo Seong-wook (piano), and Choi Seong-won (bassist) gathered to form a band. They held their first performance in November of that year at the Sejong Center next to The Piccadilly Cinema in Jongno. The band name 'Deulgukhwa' was derived from the name of the chewing gum Heo Seong-wook was chewing while he was thinking about the name of the band. After the addition of member Jo Deok-hwan, the band released their debut album, March in September 1985. Despite the album not being played on radios, the album sold 800,000 copies with the band performing sold-out concerts in numerous small theaters. Following the departure of Jo Deok-hwan, the band released their second album You and I as a six-piece with new members Choi Goo-hee and Son Jin-tae, and Joo Chang-won. After 5 years of formation, in 1989, they announced their disbandment, but in 1995, Jeon In-kwon re-formed the band with a lineup of new members.

Following the death of founding member Heo Seong-wook in 1998, the band reunited for a tour which lasted until May 30, 1999.

In 2012, the band announced they were officially reuniting for a comeback, performing several small concerts throughout 2012 and 2013. On October 20, 2013, Joo Chan-kwon died of cancer, with the band's self titled reunion album releasing posthumously on December 6, 2013. Shortly after, it was confirmed that the band would be disbanding as a result of his death. Jeon In-kwon announced plans to work with Choi Seong-won again in the future. However, in 2014, he announced that the band had no plans to reunite.

On November 14, 2016, founding guitarist Jo Deok-hwan died of cancer.

In 2021, Deulgukhwa was given the achievement award at the Korean Music Awards for their "contributions and influence on the history of Korean popular music."

== Members ==
- Jeon In-kwon – vocals, guitar (1985-1989, 1995, 1998-1999, 2012-2013)
- Choi Seong-won – bass, guitar, vocals (1985-1989, 1998-1999, 2012-2013)
- Heo Seong-wook – keyboard (1985-1989; died 1997)
- Jo Deok-hwan – guitar, vocals (1985; died 2016)
- Joo Chan-kwon – drums, vocals (1986-1989, 1998-1999, 2012-2013; his death)
- Choi Goo-hee – guitar (1986)
- Son Jin-tae – guitar (1986, 1998-1999)
- Min Jae-hyun – bass, vocals (1995)
- Lee Gun-tae – drums (1995)

== Discography ==
=== Studio albums ===
List of extended plays, with selected details, chart positions, and sales
Title	Album details	Peak chart positions	Sales
Title	Album details	KOR	Sales
March 행진	Released: September 10, 1985; Label: Seorabeol Records; Formats: LP, CD	—N/a	KOR: 800,000+
You and I 들국화 II	Released: November 25, 1986; Label: Donga Music; Formats: CD	—N/a	—N/a
Us 들국화 III	Released: April 1, 1995; Label: Synnara Music; Formats: CD	—N/a	—N/a
Deulgukhwa 들국화	Released: December 6, 2013; Label: Deulgukhwa Company; Formats: CD, digital download	11	KOR: 7,226

Compilation albums

Title	Album details
1979-1987 Memories of Deulgukhwa	Released: 1987; Label: Unknown; Formats: LP, CD
Deulgukhwa Best 12	Released: 1989; Label: Unknown; Formats: CD
Deulgukhwa Best	Released: 1995; Label: Unknown; Formats: CD

== Awards and nominations ==
Year	Award	Category	Nominated work	Result
1986	Golden Disc Awards	Album Bonsang	March	Won
2014	Golden Disc Awards	Commission Special Award	Deulgukhwa	Won
2021	Korean Music Awards	Special Achievement	Deulgukhwa	Won
