= The Divided =

English metalcore band

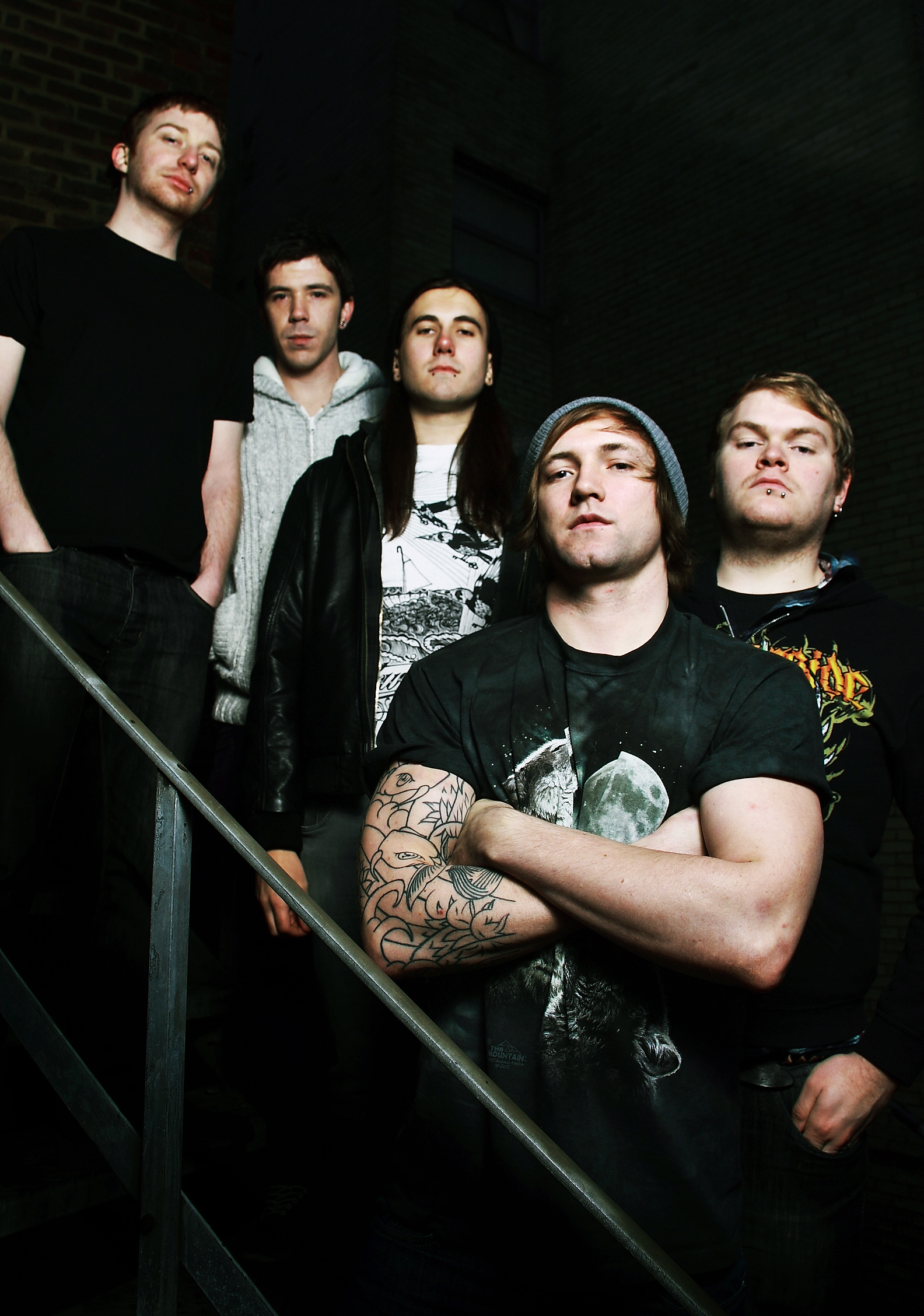
- From left: Laurien Woodgate (Former Member), Sam Hewgill, Alex Prior (Former Member), Johnny Lee Weston, Dan O'Driscoll (Former Member)

Background information
- Origin: Eastbourne, United Kingdom
- Genre: Metalcore
- Years active: 2010–2014
- Members: Johnny Lee Weston; Ross Anderson; Sam Hewgill; Dave Archer; Nathan Cottenham
- Past members: Dan O'Driscoll; Alex Prior; Laurien Woodgate
- Website: www.facebook.com/wearethedivided

The Divided were an English metalcore band from Eastbourne that appeared on the live music scene in 2010. The band's sound incorporates hardcore shouts and screams along with clean vocals accompanied by melodic and heavy riffs and breakdowns.

== History ==
The Divided formed in 2010 after the disbanding of several unsigned bands.

Following the release of their debut EP the band received extensive radio airplay and were featured in national music press Kerrang!. The band performed an extensive number of shows across the UK and have played with Heart in Hand, Silent Screams, Dead and Divine, Demoraliser, Heart of a Coward, Hacktivist and Monuments and toured with As Enemies Arise, In League and a host of other signed and unsigned acts.

During December 2011, the band announced that Karl Schubach, vocalist of American metalcore band Misery Signals, was appearing on the title track of their mini-album which was released on 24 March 2012.

In June 2012, the band announced the departure of their drummer and founding member Dan O'Driscoll. A message from the drummer confirmed he was leaving to pursue fatherhood and establishing Serenity Drums, a bespoke boutique custom drum making business. Shortly after, bassist Laurien Woodgate and guitarist Alex Prior were also confirmed to have left the band. The band announced the line-up change and new members Nathan Cottenham, Ross Anderson and Dave Archer on their Facebook page. The band released a single "Exister"; the first with the new line-up on 29 August 2013.

The band played their final show in Brighton on 2 March 2014 after announcing their split on their Facebook page.

A number of former members of the band have gone on to subsequent musical projects. Bassist Dave Archer now plays in death metal band Abhorrent Decimation and former drummer Dan O'Driscoll fronts British metalcore band CENTURIES.

== Members ==
- Johnny Lee Weston – vocals (2012–2014)
- Ross Anderson – guitar (2012–2014)
- Sam Hewgill – guitar and vocals (2010–2014)
- Dave Archer – bass (2012–2014)
- Nathan Cottenham – drums (2012–2014)
- Dan O'Driscoll – drums (2010–2012)
- Alex Prior – guitar (2010–2012)
- Laurien Woodgate – bass (2010–2012)

== Discography ==
Year	Title	Type
2010	Demo EP	Demo
2011	"Ghosts of Our Past"	Single
2012	For Tonight We're Strangers	Mini-album
2013	"Exister"	Single
