= Mimi Sisters =

South Korean musical duo

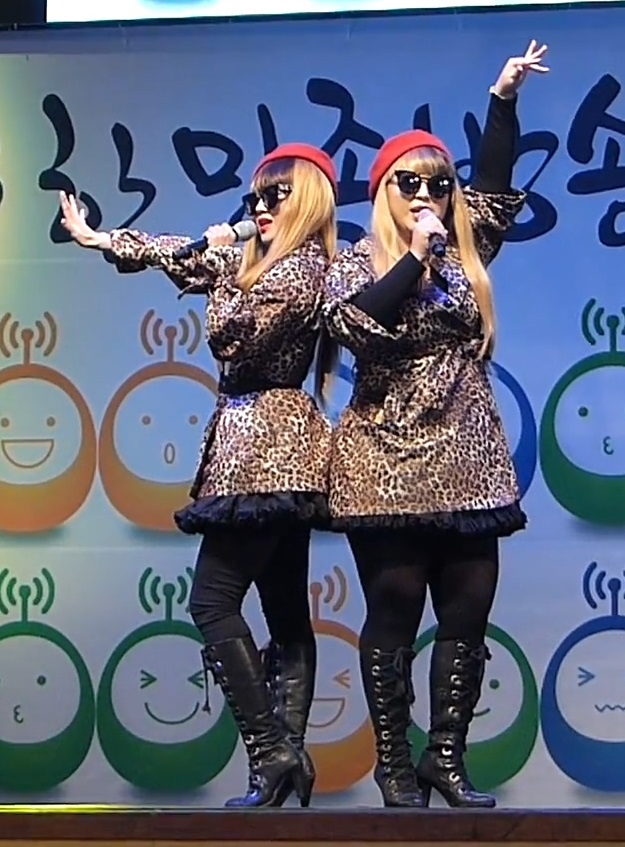

Background information
- Origin: Seoul, South Korea
- Genres: Rock
- Years active: 2008-present
- Spinoff of: Kiha & the Faces
- Members: Big Mimi; Small Mimi

Mimi Sisters (Korean: 미미 시스터즈) is a South Korean musical duo. The members are not known for their exact names, and are called 큰 미미 (Big Mimi) and 작은 미미 (Small Mimi).

== Career ==
Mimi Sisters started in 2008, as a session member of Kiha & the Faces, and played for dancing and chorus in the band. The name Mimi Sisters comes from the two members' nicknames, and they decided Big and Little Mimi by the size of their chests. They came out of the band in 2010 and became independent music duo, and released their first album in 2011, 미안하지만... 이건 전설이 될 거야 (Sorry... But This Will Be Legend). On the reason for leaving Kiha & the Faces, they said, "It was time, and we wanted to do our own music."

They released their second album, 어머, 사람 잘못 보셨어요 (Oh, You saw the wrong person), in 2014, which they said would break away from the mysterious dancers perception in the previous band. In 2018, they were appointed as ambassadors of the Seoul Suicide Prevention Center.

In 2024, they released a new single 마냥 예쁨 (Sweet AF).

== Discography ==
=== Studio albums ===
- 미안하지만... 이건 전설이 될 거야 (Sorry... But This Will Be Legend) (2011)
- 어머, 사람 잘못 보셨어요 (Oh, You saw the wrong person) (2014)
