= Jeon In-kwon =

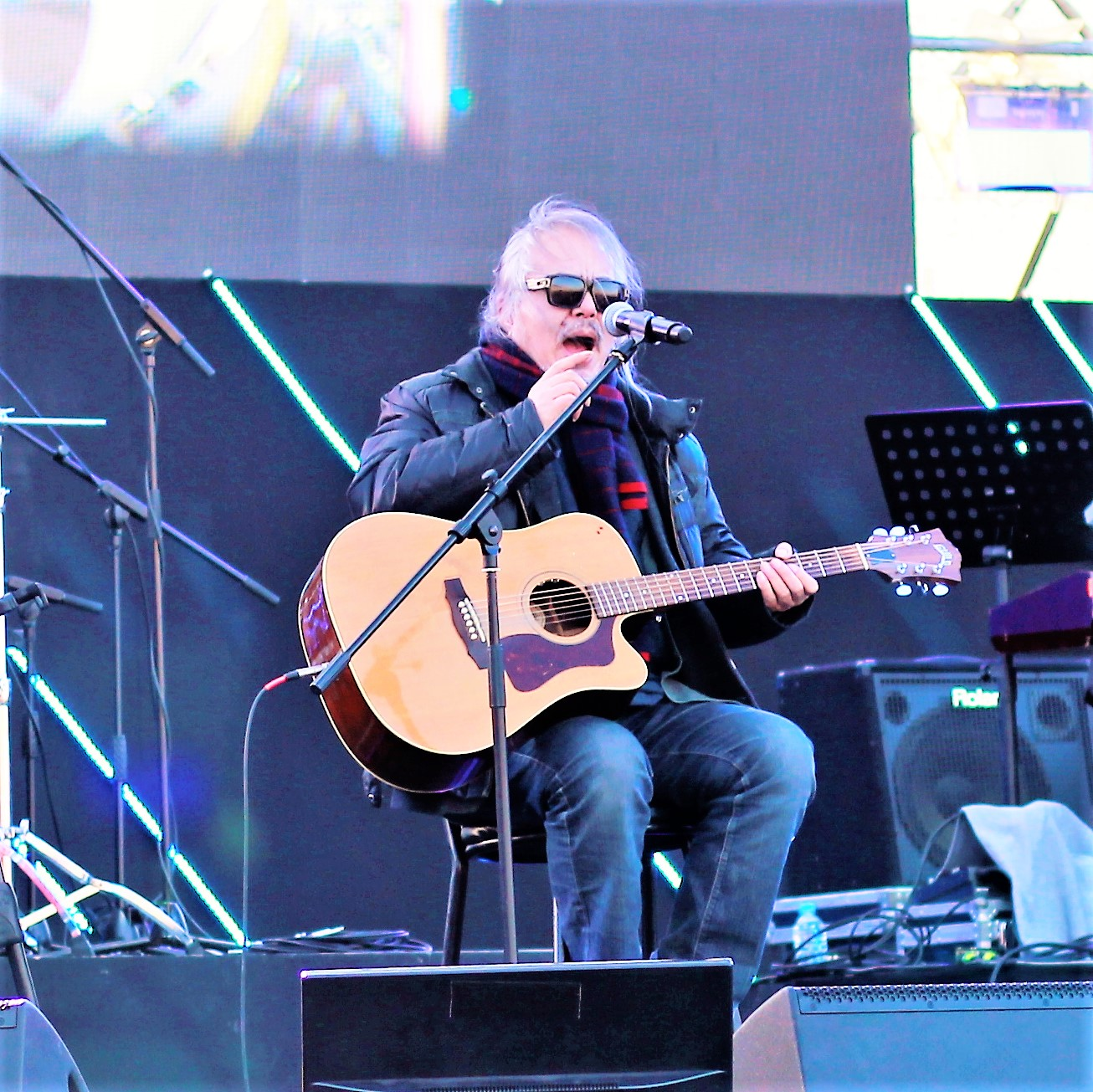
- Jeon in 2019

Background information
- Born: September 4, 1954 (age 70); Seoul, South Korea
- Genres: Rock
- Occupations: Singer-songwriter
- Years active: 1979–present
- Formerly of: Deulgukhwa, Apart and Together

Korean name
- Hangul: 전인권
- Hanja: 全仁權
- RR: Jeon Ingwon
- MR: Chŏn In'gwŏn

Jeon In-kwon (Korean: 전인권; born September 4, 1954) is a South Korean singer-songwriter and former lead singer of the band Deulgukhwa, who were known as the "Beatles of Korea."

== Career ==
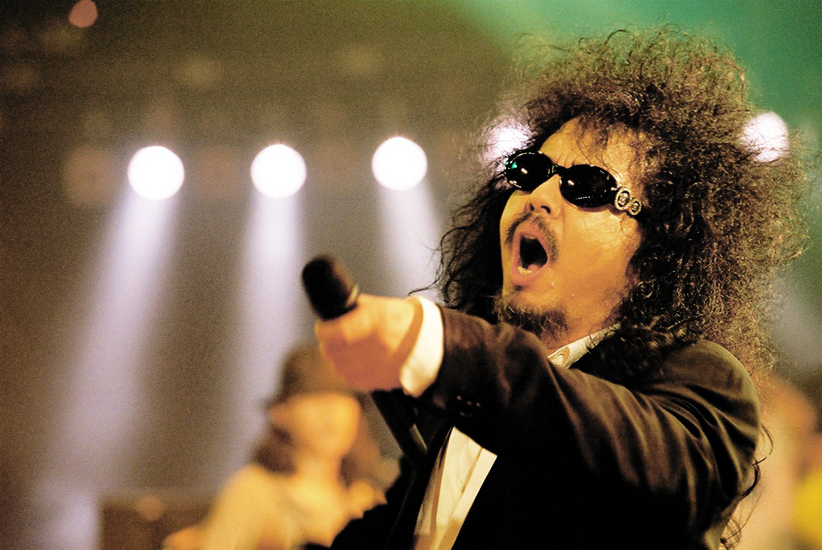
Jeon in 2003

Jeon debuted as the lead singer of the folk rock band Apart and Together (따로 또 같이). In 1979, they released their first album, Face That Hang (맴도는 얼굴). However, Jeon was unhappy with the album and later said of it, "I thought I would sneak into the recording studio and set a fire to get rid of the master tape."

In 1985, he formed the rock band Deulgukhwa (들국화), and they released their first album, March (행진). The group became immensely popular among young people for its rebellious messages in the era of South Korean military rule. In 2007, a group of music critics ranked the group's first album No. 1 on a list of the "100 Greatest Music Albums of Korea."

Jeon sang John Lennon's "Imagine" at the 2018 Winter Olympics opening ceremony in Pyeongchang, alongside singers Ha Hyun-woo, Lee Eun-mi, and Ahn Ji-young.

== Discography ==
=== Apart and Together ===
Title	Album details
Face That Hang 맴도는 얼굴	Released: 1979; Label: Jigu Records; Formats: LP

=== Deulgukhwa ===
Title	Album details
March 행진	Released: 1985; Label: Seorabeol Records; Formats: LP, CD
You & I 들국화 II	Released: 1986; Label: Donga Music; Formats: CD
Us 들국화 III	Released: 1995; Label: Synnara Music; Formats: CD
Deulgukhwa 들국화	Released: 2013; Label: Deulgukhwa Company; Formats: CD, digital download

=== As a solo artist ===
Title	Album details
Bluebird 파랑새	Released: 1988; Label: Seorabeol Records; Formats: CD
From Now On 지금까지 또 이제부터	Released: 1991; Label: Seoul Records; Formats: CD
Destiny	Released: 2003; Label: Won Entertainment; Formats: CD
전인권과 안 싸우는 사람들	Released: 2004; Label: Synnara Music; Formats: CD
