= 7 Angels 7 Plagues =

American metalcore band

- Origin: Racine, Wisconsin, U.S.
- Genres: Metalcore; Post-hardcore
- Years active: 1999–2002; 2005
- Label: Uprising
- Spinoffs: Misery Signals, Burning Empires
- Spinoff of: Intercede, Castahead
- Past members: Matt Matera; Jared Logan; Matt Mixon; Kyle Johnson; Ryan Morgan; Temo Rios

7 Angels 7 Plagues (abbreviated as 7A7P) was an American metalcore band from Racine, Wisconsin. Despite their short lived career, they have been considered a huge influence on the early underground metalcore scene and the development of melodic metalcore.

== History ==
7 Angels 7 Plagues was formed in 1999 by Jared Logan from the scraps of two local Milwaukee bands, Castahead and Intercede. The band's initial members were Logan on drums, David Lesinski on bass, Matt Matera and Ryan Morgan on guitar, and Matt Mixon on vocals; Mixon left the group in 2000 and was replaced by Temo Rios shortly after. A self-released demo EP, Until the Day Breathes and the Shadows Flee, was issued by the band in 2000 while they toured in the midwestern United States. In 2001, 7 Angels 7 Plagues released Jhazmyne's Lullaby. Allmusic described the album as a "volatile cauldron of sound"; while Canadian music magazine Exclaim! described them as "super-aggressive, hyper-melodic" and noted elements of jazz in the group's sound and graphic design.

Mixon left the group after the release of the album, and Rios returned to take his place. The group toured in support of Jhazmyne's Lullaby, but while en route to a show in Savannah, Georgia in 2002, their tourmates Compromise were involved in a car accident that caused the death of two of the band's members. Soon after this, in July 2002, Rios left 7 Angels 7 Plagues, and Jesse Zaraska, Compromise's vocalist, took his place. Simon Brody, former lead vocalist of Drowningman, considered joining the group but ultimately did not do so. Logan then departed the band several months later, and the group dissolved shortly thereafter.

The band and Uprising decided to re-release the band's first record that originally got them signed to Uprising. Now re-mastered by Alan Douches at West West Side and with new artwork in Bluenote style to match their full-length record, Jhazmyne's Lullaby. A two album set was produced for collectors.

After the band broke up in 2002, members went on to play in the bands Misery Signals, Dead to Fall, and Burning Empires, along with Adriell and xFor Death or Gloryx. They reunited in December 2005 to play three charity shows with Branden Morgan of Misery Signals filling in on drums. Matthew Matera started a mastering and recording company called American Modern Studios, located in both Chicago and New York City areas. A retrospective in 2014 stated that the band "continue to be a major influence on young metal and hardcore acts" in the Milwaukee scene, more than a decade after their breakup.

== Members ==
- Ryan Morgan – guitar (1999–2002, 2005) (Misery Signals, Burning Empires)
- Kyle Johnson – bass guitar (2001–2002, 2005) (Misery Signals, Burning Empires, Project Rocket)
- Jesse Zaraska – lead vocals (2002) (Misery Signals, Compromise)
- Jared Logan – drums/songwriter (1999–2002) (Martyr A.D., Up in Arms)
- Matthew Matera – guitar/songwriter(1999–2002) (Dream Party, Royalty in Exile, Dead To Fall, Adriell, Black Candy)
- Cuahtemoc "Temo" Rios – lead vocals (1999–2000, 2002)
- David Lesinski – bass guitar (1999–2001)
- Matthew Mixon – lead vocals (2000–2002, 2005) (End This Day, Burning Empires, Divine Right, xFor Death and Gloryx)

== Discography ==
=== Studio albums ===
- Jhazmyne's Lullaby (2001, Uprising)

=== EPs ===
- Until the Day Breathes and the Shadows Flee (2000, self-released, 2002, Uprising)

=== Compilation appearances ===
- "Dandelion" on A Testament to Broken Walls (2001, Akeldama/Backroad)
- Hugs n' Chugs 2001 (2001, The Nuance Formula)
- Robot Mosh Fest 2002 (2002, Didn't That Hurt?)
- "Dandelion" on Lullaby For The Apocalypse (2003, Uprising)
