= Kiha & The Faces =

South Korean indie rock band

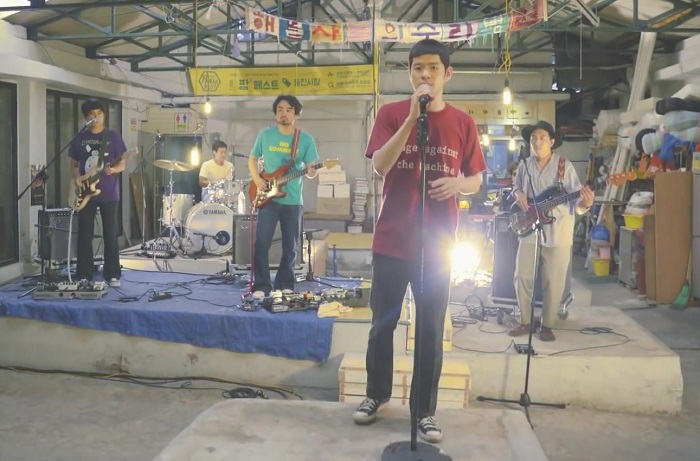
- Kiha & The Faces in 2016.

Background information
- Origin: South Korea
- Genres: Indie rock
- Years active: 2008–2018
- Label: DRDR AC
- Past members: Chang Kiha; Yohei Hasegawa; Lee Min-ki; Jeong Jung-yeop; Lee Jong-min; Jeon Il-jun; Mimi Sisters; Kim Hyeon-ho
- Website: kihafaces.com

Kiha & The Faces (Korean: 장기하와 얼굴들) was a South Korean indie rock band led by singer Chang Kiha. The band debuted in 2008 with the single "Cheap Coffee" and went on to become one of South Korea's most popular and commercially successful indie rock bands. In October 2018, Chang announced the group's fifth and final album, Mono, along with news that the band members would be parting ways.

== Members ==
=== Former members ===
- Chang Kiha - Vocals, Guitar
- Lee Min-ki - Guitar
- Jeong Jung-yeop - Bass guitar
- Lee Jong-min - Keyboard
- Yohei Hasegawa - Guitar
- Jeon Il-jun - Drum
- Mimi Sisters - Dance, Chorus
- Kim Hyeon-ho - Drum

== Discography ==
=== Studio albums ===
Title	Album details	Peak chart positions	Sales
Title	Album details	KOR	Sales
Living the Carefree Life (별일 없이 산다)	Released: February 27, 2009; Formats: CD, LP, digital download; Label: DRDR AC	—	
Kiha & The Faces (장기하와 얼굴들)	Released: June 9, 2011; Formats: CD, LP, digital download; Label: DRDR AC	—	
Human Mind (사람의 마음)	Released: October 15, 2014; Formats: CD, LP, digital download; Label: DRDR AC	5	KOR: 6,708
Who's Good At Their Own Love? (내 사랑에 노련한 사람이 어딨나요)	Released: June 16, 2016; Formats: CD, LP, digital download; Label: DRDR AC	10	KOR: 2,881
Mono	Released: November 1, 2018; Formats: CD, LP, digital download; Label: DRDR AC	17	KOR: 3,365

=== Singles ===
Title	Year	Peak chart positions	Sales (DL)	Album
Title	Year	KOR	Sales (DL)	Album
"Cheap Coffee" (싸구려 커피)	2008	—		Living the Carefree Life
"The Moon is Waxing, Let's Go" (달이 차오른다, 가자)	2009	—		Living the Carefree Life
"A Sort Of Relationship" (그렇고 그런 사이)	2011	16		Kiha & The Faces
"I Watched TV" (TV를 봤네)	2011	64		Kiha & The Faces
"I Heard A Rumor" (풍문으로 들었소)	2012	64		Nameless Gangster: Rules of the Time OST
"Super Weeds Man" (슈퍼 잡초맨) (with Haha)	2013	8	KOR: 386,896	Infinite Challenge Jayu-ro Song Festival
"Human Mind" (사람의 마음)	2014	63	KOR: 34,678	Human Mind
"New Year's Luck" (새해 복)	2015	—	KOR: 13,006	Non-album single
"Kieuk" (ㅋ)	2016	35	KOR: 107,012	Who's Good At Their Own Love?
"That's Just What You Think" (그건 니 생각이고)	2018	—		Mono
"Nothing After All" (별거 아니라고)	2018	—		Mono

== Awards and nominations ==
=== Cyworld Digital Music Awards ===
Year	Category	Recipient	Result
2009	Tam Eum Mania Award	"The Moon is Waxing, Let's Go"	Won

=== Golden Disc Awards ===
Year	Category	Recipient	Result
2009	Rock Award	"Cheap Coffee"	Won

=== Korean Music Awards ===
Year	Category	Recipient	Result
2009	Song of the Year	"Cheap Coffee"	Won
2009	Best Rock Song	"Cheap Coffee"	Won
2009	Male Musicians of the Year Netizen Vote	Kiha & The Faces	Won
2012	Musician of the Year	Kiha & The Faces	Won
2012	Album of the Year	Kiha & The Faces	Won
2012	Best Rock Album	Kiha & The Faces	Won
2012	Best Rock Song	"That Kind of Relationship"	Won

=== Mnet Asian Music Awards ===
Year	Category	Recipient	Result
2009	Best Band Performance	"Living Without Incidents"	Nominated
2011	Best Band Performance	"Just Know Each Other"	Nominated

== Honors ==
In 2012, Kiha & The Faces were given the South Korean Minister of Culture, Sports and Tourism Commendation for increasing public interest in indie music through their songs.
