= Chang Kiha =

South Korean singer (born 1981)

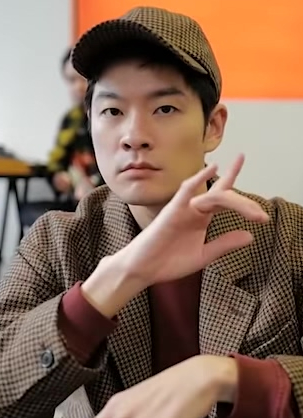
- Chang in 2018

Background information
- Born: February 20, 1982 (age 44); Seoul, South Korea
- Genres: Indie rock, folk rock
- Occupations: Singer; songwriter; actor; radio host
- Instruments: Vocals, drums, guitar
- Years active: 2002–present
- Label: DooRooDooRoo Artist Company
- Formerly of: Kiha & The Faces

- Chang Kiha
- Hangul: 장기하
- Hanja: 張基河
- RR: Jang Giha
- MR: Chang Kiha

Chang Kiha (Korean: 장기하; born February 20, 1982) is a South Korean singer-songwriter, actor, essay writer and radio host. He is best known as the lead singer of the indie rock band Kiha & The Faces.

== Early life and education ==
Chang was born in Seoul on February 20, 1982. His father ran a manufacturing company, and Chang later said he did not experience any financial hardships growing up. Chang graduated from Seoul National University, where he studied sociology. While in college, he played drums for the rock group Nunco Band.

== Career ==
=== Music ===
Chang debuted with his indie rock band Kiha & The Faces in 2008. The band's first single, "Cheap Coffee", was a hit, and the band has since become one of South Korea's most popular indie rock groups.

=== Acting ===
In 2013, Chang made his acting debut playing supporting role on the daily sitcom Potato Star 2013QR3. He received positive reviews from the public for his portrayal of guitarist Jang Yul.

=== Radio ===
Chang hosted the radio show Chang Kiha's Great Radio on SBS Power FM from 2012 to 2015. He left the show to focus on his music career.

== Music style ==
Kiha is known for his specific style of music, where he "talks like he sings, sings like he talks."

Kiha does his own thing. Dramabeans have once reviewed him as "the guy who's so unconcerned with being cool that he IS cool. By ignoring trends, he thereby sets his own."

== Personal life ==
On October 8, 2015, Chang and IU declared they had been in a romantic relationship from 2013. They split in January 2017 but remained in good terms as friends.

== Discography ==
=== Studio albums ===
| Title | Album details | Peak chart positions | Sales |
| Title | Album details | KOR | Sales |
|---|---|---|---|
| Hakichangkiha (하기장기하) | Released: August 8, 2025; Label: DooRooDooRoo Artist Company; Format: CD, digital download | 93 | KOR: 844 |

=== Extended plays ===
| Title | Album details | Peak chart positions |
| Title | Album details | KOR |
|---|---|---|
| Levitation (공중부양) | Released: February 22, 2022; Label: DooRooDooRoo Artist Company; Format: CD, digital download | 66 |

=== Singles ===
| Title | Year | Album |
|---|---|---|
| "Dreams of Whom" (어떤이의 꿈) (with Jeon Il-jun, feat. Nucksal) | 2018 | The Way You Keep Friendship - SSaW Tribute Vol.4 |
| "Silverhair Express" (Chang Kiha Remix) (with Hyukoh) | 2020 | Non-album single |
| "February 22, 2022" (2022년 2월 22일) | 2022 | Levitation |
| "Envy None" (부럽지가 않어) | 2022 | Levitation |
| "Do / Do Or Don't" (해 / 할건지말건지) | 2023 | Non-album single |

== Filmography ==
=== Film ===
| Year | Title | Role | Ref. |
|---|---|---|---|
| 2023 | Past Lives | Hae Sung's friend | |

=== Television ===
| Year | Title | Role | Note |
|---|---|---|---|
| 2013 | You Hee-yeol's Sketchbook | Himself / Guest | Episode 200 |
| 2013 | Infinite Challenge | Himself / Guest | Episodes 346, 349, 351–354 |
| 2013 | Running Man | Himself / Guest | Episode 176 |
| 2013–2014 | Potato Star 2013QR3 | Jang Yul | |
| 2014 | Radio Star | Himself / Guest | |
| 2014 | Non-Summit | Himself / Guest | Episode 16 |
| 2014 | Welcome Back to School | Himself / Guest | Episode 19–22 |
| 2016 | My Little Television | Himself / Guest | Episode 61–62 |
| 2017 | Night Goblin | Himself / Guest | Episode 21 |
| 2018 | Night Goblin | Himself / Guest | Episode 22 |
| 2018 | Problematic Men | Himself / Guest | Episode 145–147 |
| 2018 | It's Dangerous Beyond the Blankets | Himself | Cast member |
| 2018 | Radio Star | Himself / Guest | Episode 594 |
| 2020 | You Hee-yeol's Sketchbook | Himself / Guest | Episode 485 |
| 2021 | Painting Thieves | Himself | Cast member |

=== Web shows ===
| Year | Title | Role | Notes | Ref. |
|---|---|---|---|---|
| 2022 | The Homeless of the Soul | Himself / Host | | |
| 2022–2023 | Daytime Drinking Geometry | Himself / Host | Season 1–2 | |

== Awards and nominations ==
Name of the award ceremony, year presented, category, nominee, and the result of the nomination
| Award ceremony | Year | Category | Nominee / Work | Result | Ref. |
|---|---|---|---|---|---|
| Blue Dragon Film Awards | 2023 | Best Music | Smugglers | Won | |
| Grand Bell Awards | 2023 | Best Music | Smugglers | Nominated | |
| Korean Association of Film Critics Awards | 2023 | Music Award | Smugglers | Won | |
| Korean Music Awards | 2023 | Musician of the Year | Chang Kiha | Nominated | |
| Korean Music Awards | 2023 | Song of the Year | "Envy None" | Nominated | |
| Korean Music Awards | 2023 | Best Pop Song | "Envy None" | Nominated | |
| Korean Music Awards | 2023 | Best Pop Album | Levitation | Nominated | |
