= Sultan of the Disco =

South Korean disco band

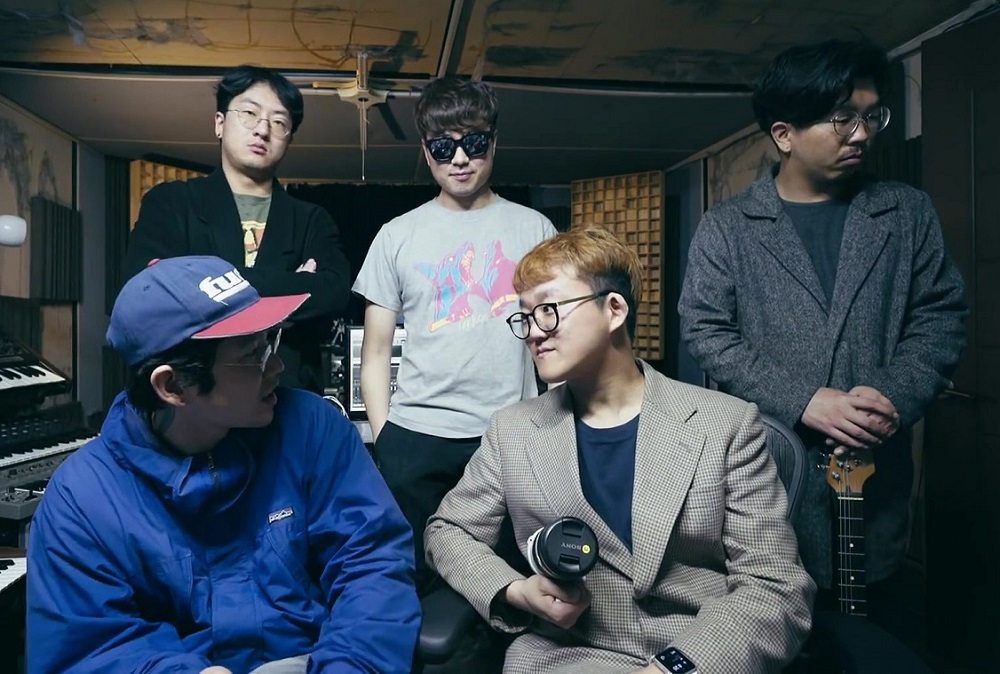
- Sultan of the Disco in 2016

Background information
- Origin: South Korea
- Genres: Alternative R&B, Disco, Funk, Synthpop
- Years active: 2006–present
- Label: BGBG Records
- Members: Nahzam Sue (나잠 수) (Vocals, Dancing, Synthesizer); J.J Hassan (J. J. 핫산) (Vocals, Dancing); Ganji Kim (김간지) (Drums); G (Bass); Hong-ki (홍기) (Guitar)
- Website: sultanofthedisco.com

Sultan of the Disco (Korean: 술탄 오브 더 디스코) is a disco band from South Korea.

== History ==
The band was formed in 2006, inspired by soul and funk music from the golden age of disco represented as Chic, Kool and the Gang and Jackson 5, and was named after the Dire Straits song "Sultans of Swing". The band published a fictional biography on Cyworld in 2007 and was signed by Boonga Boonga Records (BGBG Records).

The band released their debut EP, I've Got a Hottie Little Sister, in 2008. This was followed by another EP in 2010, Groove official. Their debut studio album, The Golden Age, was released in 2013.

In 2014 the band was invited to perform at the Glastonbury Festival, and returned once again for 2016. They've subsequently been invited to Summer Sonic in 2014 and 2016, The Great Escape in 2017, and Brisbane Festival in 2018.

Their second studio album, Aliens, was released on October 30, 2018. The album marked the change in band's musical direction, shifting away from their typical disco repertoire and branching into more experimental and toned-down alternative R&B styles.

== Discography ==
=== Studio albums ===
- 2013: The Golden Age
- 2018: Aliens

=== EPs ===
- 2008: I've Got a Hottie Little Sister (여동생이 생겼어요)
- 2010: Groove Official
- 2019: Easy Listening For Love

=== Singles ===
- 2007: Magic Prince (요술왕자)
- 2013: Oriental Disco Express (오리엔탈 디스코 특급)
- 2014: Tang Tang Ball (탱탱볼)
- 2014: 웨ㅔㅔㅔㅔ (Weh eh eh eh eh) feat. Black Nut
- 2015: SQ (We Don't Need No EQ IQ)
- 2015: 니온 라이트 (Neon Light)
- 2018: The Slide (미끄럼틀) feat. SUMIN
- 2019: Shining Road
- 2020: Waiting For Your Calling Back
