= DooRooDooRoo Artist Company =

South Korean independent label

- Founded: 2010
- Founder: Kang Myeongjin
- Genre: Rock music, independent music
- Country of origin: South Korea
- Location: Seoul, South Korea
- Official website: drdr.ac

DooRooDooRoo Artist Company (also known as DRDR AC) is a South Korean independent record label based in Seoul, South Korea. The label was founded in 2010 around Kang Myeongjin of BGBG Records, with Kiha & The Faces and Kang San-eh first joining the label. The company has the slogan "For the greater benefit of artists".

== Artists ==
- Baek Hyun-jin
- Bongjeingan
- Chang Kiha
- Dadaism Club
- Debtors
- Han Dasom
- Hyukoh
- Im Geumbi
- Kang San-eh
- Kim Yeyoung
- Kiha & The Faces
- Lee Dana
- Lee Sulla
- No Sangho
- Parasol
- Yohei Hasegawa
- Yoon Daeryoon
- The Oysters
