= Fall Out Boy's Evening Out with Your Girlfriend =

Demo album by Fall Out Boy
- Released: March 25, 2003
- Recorded: February-September of 2002 in Milwaukee
- Genres: Pop-punk; emo
- Length: 29:39
- Label: Uprising
- Producers: Jared Logan; Fall Out Boy

Fall Out Boy chronology
Project Rocket / Fall Out Boy (2002)	Fall Out Boy's Evening Out with Your Girlfriend (2003)	Take This to Your Grave (2003)

Remastered release cover

Professional ratings
Review scores
Source	Rating
AllMusic	3.5/5 stars
Punktastic	1.5/5 stars
Rolling Stone	2/5 stars

Fall Out Boy's Evening Out with Your Girlfriend is the debut mini-LP and the second extended play (EP) by American rock band Fall Out Boy. Recorded in two days on a low budget, the rushed schedule left the band discontent and ceasing to call it their debut album. Fall Out Boy's Evening Out with Your Girlfriend was released in 2003 through Uprising Records against the band's wishes. In 2005, Uprising released a remastered reissue as Evening Out with Your Girlfriend, without the band's involvement, following the band's very successful major label debut From Under the Cork Tree. It eventually sold over 127,000 copies in the United States by August 2008, according to Billboard. The photograph on the cover of this album was shot by Adeet Deshmukh in Chicago's Pick Me Up Café located at 3408 N. Clark Street. The woman who is pictured on the cover is a waitress at said café, and her name is Lavinia, as noted in the booklet of the album.

== Background and development ==
Fall Out Boy formed near Chicago, Illinois, in 2001. The band debuted with a self-released demo in the same year and released Project Rocket / Fall Out Boy, a split EP with Project Rocket, in 2002, through Uprising Records. The lyrics to the whole album are written by lead vocalist Patrick Stump. On later albums, bassist Pete Wentz wrote the majority of the band's lyrics. The album is also the only Fall Out Boy album not featuring Andy Hurley on drums. Evening Out was not recorded with five members, contrary to what is shown in the album art. The members at that time were Patrick Stump (lead vocals), Pete Wentz (bass guitar), Joe Trohman (guitar), and Mike Pareskuwicz (drums). Although incorrect, Pareskuwicz and guitarist TJ Racine have been said to be two Chicago musicians the band recruited in their early days, who left after Evening Out was released before Stump picked up the guitar and Hurley joined as the full-time drummer to form the band's current lineup. Stump explained that "TJ Racine was already out of the band by the time [Fall Out Boy] tracked [(recorded) the album]" and that TJ "wasn't in the band for that long". Pareskuwicz did indeed handle the drumming duties for the album. After the release, he left the band, and Andy Hurley would join as the current drummer and record the follow-up album Take This to Your Grave (2003). Trohman played almost all the guitars on it, with Stump playing a small part on "Moving Pictures". The entire album was recorded in two days and the rushed nature left the band dissatisfied and did not want it released. Stump also stated "I don't consider it a real album." The band was not involved in the 2005 re-release and did not receive royalties for either version, with Patrick Stump stating "both were a scam on us".

Songs from Evening Out were played by the band in their early shows to a small local audience before they received mainstream attention. When the band reached mainstream popularity, they did not often mention this album.

"Calm Before the Storm" was later re-recorded with additions to the arrangement, including backing vocals (screaming) from bassist Pete Wentz, for the follow-up album Take This to Your Grave later that year. "Pretty in Punk" is a play on the title of the John Hughes film Pretty in Pink, and "Parker Lewis Can't Lose (But I'm Gunna Give It My Best Shot)" is a reference to the television show Parker Lewis Can't Lose. Different recordings of "Switchblades and Infidelity", "Growing Up" and "Moving Pictures" were released on the band's Project Rocket / Fall Out Boy split EP.

Uprising Records re-released the album on May 17, 2005 to capitalize on Fall Out Boy's breakthrough success with "Sugar, We're Goin Down". This time, the album was remastered with re-recorded drums and remixed by Jared Logan and Richard Bredice.

A part of the song "Growing Up" is sung by William Beckett of The Academy Is... in Fall Out Boy's later song "What a Catch, Donnie", from their 2008 release Folie à Deux. The "Project Rocket / Fall Out Boy" version of the song was included as the last track on the band's 2009 greatest hits album, Believers Never Die – Greatest Hits.

As of November 1, 2021, the EP has been made available on major streaming platforms.

== Reception ==
=== Chart performance ===
Fall Out Boy's debut album has had no mainstream attention, and it has not reached any charts. No singles were released from this album. The original release was not featured on the official Fall Out Boy website, with only the remastered edition being featured. Many reviewers, including AllMusic, consider Take This to Your Grave as Fall Out Boy's first album, possibly due to Evening Out with Your Girlfriend being a mini-LP and not a full-length release, or unknown. In the lyric booklet of Believers Never Die – Greatest Hits, the band begins with the making of Take This to Your Grave, completely omitting Evening Out with Your Girlfriend. However, the track "Growing Up" is included as the last track Believers Never Die – Greatest Hits as a "rarity" (though this version is taken from the Project Rocket / Fall Out Boy split EP).

This album was not featured by any of Fall Out Boy's official channels until "Calm Before the Storm" was re-recorded for the band's "official" debut album Take This to Your Grave.

== Track listing ==
All tracks are written by Fall Out Boy.

Original version
No.	Title	Length
1.	"Honorable Mention"	3:25
2.	"Calm Before the Storm"	4:43
3.	"Switchblades and Infidelity"	3:14
4.	"Pretty in Punk"	3:36
5.	"Growing Up"	2:48
6.	"The World's Not Waiting (For Five Tired Boys in a Broken Down Van)"	2:39
7.	"Short, Fast, and Loud"	2:16
8.	"Moving Pictures"	3:31
9.	"Parker Lewis Can't Lose (But I'm Gunna Give It My Best Shot)"	3:22
Total length:		29:34

2005 remastered version
No.	Title	Length
1.	"Honorable Mention"	3:25
2.	"Calm Before the Storm"	4:41
3.	"Switchblades and Infidelity"	2:02
4.	"Pretty in Punk"	3:35
5.	"Growing Up"	2:48
6.	"The World's Not Waiting (For Five Tired Boys in a Broken Down Van)"	2:38
7.	"Short, Fast, and Loud"	2:18
8.	"Moving Pictures"	3:28
9.	"Parker Lewis Can't Lose (But I'm Gunna Give It My Best Shot)"	3:18
Total length:		28:13

Notes

- Track 2 was re-recorded for Take This to Your Grave.
- Tracks 3, 5, and 8 are re-recorded from Project Rocket / Fall Out Boy.
- Tracks 3 and 5 are also re-recorded from the band's demo.

== Personnel ==
Fall Out Boy

- Patrick Stump – vocals
- Joe Trohman – guitar
- T.J. Kunasch – guitar (though credited, did not play on the album)
- Pete Wentz – bass
- Mike Pareskuwicz – drums

Technical personnel

- Jared Logan – production
- Fall Out Boy – production
- Cole Reed – design
- Adeet Deshmukh – photography
