= Take This to Your Grave =

- Original standard edition cover (Note: Later versions feature the same photo with a different tint of blue and the names after the title reading "Pete Wentz / Patrick Stump / Joe Trohman / Andy Hurley".)

Studio album by Fall Out Boy
- Released: May 6, 2003
- Recorded: December 2002 – March 2003
- Studios: Smart Studios, Madison, Wisconsin; Gravity Studios, Chicago, Illinois; Rosebud Studios, Skokie, Illinois
- Genres: Pop-punk; emo; post-hardcore
- Length: 39:24
- Label: Fueled by Ramen
- Producer: Sean O'Keefe

Fall Out Boy chronology
Fall Out Boy's Evening Out with Your Girlfriend (2003)	Take This to Your Grave (2003)	My Heart Will Always Be the B-Side to My Tongue (2004)

Singles from Take This to Your Grave
- 1. "Dead on Arrival" Released: April 4, 2003; 2. "Grand Theft Autumn/Where Is Your Boy" Released: August 4, 2003; 3. "Saturday" Released: December 21, 2003

Alternative cover
- The rejected cover, which would later appear on the first vinyl release.

Take This to Your Grave is the debut studio album by the American rock band Fall Out Boy, released on May 6, 2003, by Fueled by Ramen. It was their only album under the label, as they signed to Island Records following its release; the band would return to Fueled by Ramen for their 2023 album, So Much (for) Stardust. Sean O'Keefe had helped with the band's demo, and they returned to Smart Studios in Madison, Wisconsin to record the bulk of their first album with him. Living on a stranger's floor for part of the time and running out of money halfway through, the band recorded seven songs in nine days, bringing them together with the additional three from the demo.

While lead vocalist Patrick Stump had previously written all of the album's lyrics and took them lightly, bassist Pete Wentz took to the process with considerable seriousness and obsessively picked apart his bandmate's lyrics. The exhausting process led to numerous revisions of single songs and several arguments. The album cover, which shows the four bandmates sitting on a broken futon, features a blue tint reminiscent of jazz records, and was the second choice after the original was rejected by the Fueled by Ramen label.

Take This to Your Grave gradually created interest in the band as they toured across the country, including a five-day stint on Warped Tour 2004. The album produced three singles, including the minor success "Grand Theft Autumn/Where Is Your Boy", and has often been named as a vital blueprint for 2000s pop-punk, with Alternative Press calling it a "subcultural touchstone" and a "magical, transcendent, and deceptively smart pop-punk masterpiece that ushered in a vibrant scene resurgence with a potent combination of charisma, new media marketing and hardcore-punk urgency". Take This to Your Grave is often regarded as one of the greatest pop-punk albums of all time. In 2017, Rolling Stone placed the album at number 5 on their list of the "50 Greatest Pop-Punk Albums".

== Background ==
Fall Out Boy was formed in 2001 in the Chicago suburb of Wilmette, Illinois by friends Pete Wentz and Joe Trohman. Wentz was a "visible fixture" of the relatively small Chicago hardcore punk scene of the late 1990s, performing in various groups including the metalcore band Arma Angelus. Wentz was growing dissatisfied with the changing mores of the community, which he viewed as a transition from political activism to an emphasis on moshing and breakdowns. With his enthusiasm in Arma Angelus waning, he created a pop punk side project with Trohman. Trohman met Patrick Stump, the drummer for grindcore band xgrinding processx at a bookstore in Wilmette. The band's first public performance was in a cafeteria at DePaul University. The band's only performance with guitarist John Flamandan and original drummer Ben Rose was in retrospect described as "goofy" and "bad", but Trohman made an active effort to make the band work, picking up members for practice.

The band later went to Wisconsin to record a proper demo with 7 Angels 7 Plagues drummer Jared Logan. Uprising Records owner Sean Muttaqi wanted to release half of it as a split extended play (EP) with Andy Hurley's band Project Rocket, which the band viewed as competition. With Logan's help, the group put together a collection of songs in two days, and recorded them as Fall Out Boy's Evening Out with Your Girlfriend. The rushed recording experience, and underdeveloped songs, left the band discontented. At Smart Studios in Madison, Wisconsin to record their three songs of a possible split 7-inch with 504 Plan, engineer Sean O'Keefe suggested they record with Hurley who sat in for the session.

The band booked a two-week tour with Spitalfield, and invited Hurley to fill-in for recently departed members, while Stump borrowed one of Trohman's guitars for the trek. The band began to shop around the three songs from their unreleased split as a demo to record labels. In the process, Bob McLynn of Crush Management became the band's first manager. The band returned to the studio with O'Keefe to record several more tracks to create label interest. John Janick of Fueled by Ramen had heard an early version of a song online and cold-called the band at their apartment, first reaching Stump and later talking to Wentz for an hour. Rob Stevenson from Island Records eventually offered the band a "first-ever incubator sort of deal", in which they gave the band money to sign with Fueled by Ramen for their one-off debut, knowing they could "upstream" the band to radio with the sophomore record. Fueled by Ramen, at the time the smallest of independent labels clamoring to sign the band, would effectively release their debut album, and help build their ever-expanding fanbase before they moved to Island. While the band had secured an investment from the label, they did not see immediate success.

== Recording and production ==
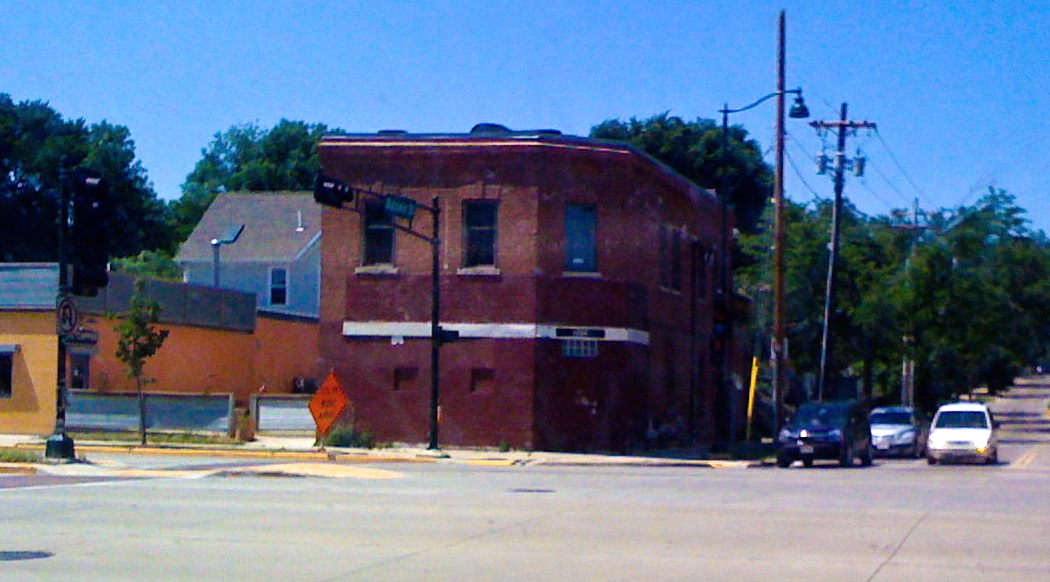
The bulk of the album was recorded at the now-closed Smart Studios.

The pre-production phase was completed in a warehouse the band used at night, free of charge, where they discussed how they wanted the songs to sound. Many songs intended for the album did not fit, and though the band originally planned to use the leftovers for future albums, they abandoned the songs instead.

The band again partnered with O'Keefe at Smart Studios in Madison, bringing together the three songs from the demo and recording an additional seven songs in nine days. According to Stump, the band didn't "sleep anywhere that we could shower [...] There was a girl that Andy's girlfriend at the time went to school with who let us sleep on her floor, but we'd be there for maybe four hours at a time. It was crazy." According to Wentz, "we were lying to our parents about what we were doing, cutting corners. I was supposed to be in school. I didn't have access to money or a credit card. I don't think any of us did." The studio provided the band with soda during the recording process, but the band was hungry: "We were like, 'Could you take that soda money and buy us peanut butter, jelly and bread?' which they did." The group's goal with Grave was to make an album that was as "seamless and good from song to song" as Saves the Day's Through Being Cool.

O'Keefe paid for studio time for the band himself. Because of his perfectionist tendencies he pushed the band so that Hurley felt the recording process was more professional. He compared the making of Take This to Your Grave to "going to war", stating that recording with the rest of the band was similar to "being in the trenches together". The process was not without its difficulties: "It's not always happy: There's a lot of push and pull and each of them trying to get their thing. With [the album], we never let anything go until all three of us were happy," said O'Keefe. Wentz recalled that it was "mind-blowing" to see a certification plaque for Nirvana's Nevermind on a wall. The band was shown the microphone used in the recording of that album, but were unable to use it as "they said only Shirley [Manson] from Garbage could use it". The group created a running joke to pick on O'Keefe after he mentioned he had smoked marijuana at least once months before. The quartet was straight-edge then and exaggerated the story to insinuate O'Keefe was a habitual, obsessive user of the drug. The band credited O'Keefe in the album booklet with "like 10 different stoner nicknames - 'Dimebag O'Keefe'", although only several remained after some record executives felt it "excessively ridiculous".

The band received a $40,000 investment from Island Records to create the album, but it was completed for roughly $18,000.

== Composition ==
=== Music ===
The album was categorized as pop-punk, emo, emo pop and scene music. Mani Mostofi, former vocalist of Racetraitor, had held many discussions with Wentz when the band formed about their pop punk sound, which Wentz described as "softcore". Mostofi described Take This to Your Grave as "sounding like Hot Topic," but "feeling like CBGB."

=== Lyrics ===
According to Johnny Loftus of AllMusic, Take This to Your Grave's lyrical content "merges musings on love and youth with healthy amounts of cutting cynicism, savvy popular culture touchstones, and cheeky phraseology". Stump wrote "Saturday" about how he felt like a failure on graduating from high school, and originally kept the song to himself until the group needed additional songs. Stump then collaborated with bassist Pete Wentz to complete the song's lyrics. "Grand Theft Autumn/Where Is Your Boy" deals with jealousy and unrequited love.

Stump, who viewed himself an "artsy fartsy dude who didn't want to be in a pop-punk band," had written most of the band's lyrics to that point, including the songs "Saturday", "Dead on Arrival", "Grand Theft Autumn/Where is Your Boy", "Grenade Jumper", and "Homesick at Space Camp". While Stump did not take his lyrics seriously, Wentz had recently re-committed himself to the band and "it felt like he had a list of things in his head he wanted to do right. Lyrics were on that list." Wentz picked apart Stump's lyrics excessively down to syllables and began giving him notes. Stump felt exasperated, remarking to the bassist, "You just write the fucking lyrics dude. Just give me your lyrics and I'll write around them." The duo were new to this process, and they found it exhausting: Stump would write the song, scrap his lyrics, then attempt to fit Wentz's lyrics where his were.

Stump was more concerned with the melodies, including the rhythm, syncopation and alliteration of words, while Wentz felt none of it mattered if the lyrics themselves lacked meaning. The result made the two musicians unhappy: "Man, did we fight about that," recalled Stump in 2013. "We fought for nine days straight all while not sleeping and smelling like shit. It was one long argument, but I think some of the best moments are the result of that." O'Keefe commented on this process: "They would go through 10 revisions for one song. I thought I was going to lose my mind with both of them."

== Songs ==
"'Tell That Mick He Just Made My List of Things to Do Today'" opens with a telephone dial tone, which Wentz found particularly enjoyable, as it provided stark contrast to the louder instrumentation to follow. The song's chorus was the result of many arguments between Wentz and Stump over the phonetic phrasing of words versus their meaning. Wentz ended up throwing out all of Stump's lyrics for the first time in the recording process, and rewrote them entirely himself - a first. Stump said, "I realized I must really want to be in this band at this point if I'm willing to put up with this much fuss." Lyrics such as "Let's play this game called 'when you catch fire' / I wouldn't piss to put you out," were inspired by Chris Conley's use of bizarre metaphors to prove a point on Saves the Day's Through Being Cool. The song title in itself is a slightly altered quote from the 1998 movie Rushmore. "Dead on Arrival" is among the earliest compositions, dating to before Hurley joined the band. Stump's song "Saturday" marked one of the first times Wentz and Stump collaborated on lyrics. Wentz considered it the best representation of the band at the time. In contrast, both disliked "Grand Theft Autumn/Where Is Your Boy" during the recording process; Stump particularly disliked the a cappella opening, which was O'Keefe's idea.

"Sending Postcards from a Plane Crash" is largely a studio creation, and was seldom played live by the band. Stump and Wentz had a particularly big fight regarding the track "Chicago Is So Two Years Ago", which Stump initially did not want to record. He had secretly kept it to himself in case the band did not work out, and he wanted to pursue his own music, but O'Keefe wanted to introduce it to the rest of the band after he heard Stump singing it to himself in the studio lobby. Wentz disliked several lyrics, and he and Stump argued over every word one by one. The bridge features a guest appearance by Motion City Soundtrack frontman Justin Pierre. The band had wanted Pierre on the song but schedules did not work out initially. O'Keefe, who was friends with Pierre, recorded Pierre's part, which he wrote while the band was on tour, leaving it as a "surprise" for the rest of the group. "Grenade Jumper" references Christopher Gutierrez, a member of the Fall Out Boy precursor band Arma Angelus. Gutierrez was an early supporter of the band and attended each show from the beginning. The song's chorus came from a conversation between Trohman and Stump in the kitchen of the band's apartment. Trohman said they should write a fan appreciation song, and Stump noted how Chris "was [their] only friend". The song's title refers to a phrase coined by the band regarding "whoever would be the person that would have... um, relations Biblically with a girl in order to have the rest of the band stay at the house," said Wentz.

"Calm Before the Storm" appears on the band's first true recording, Fall Out Boy's Evening Out with Your Girlfriend. Its bridge features a "screaming harmony" from Wentz, which took "five or six" digital tracks to create. "Reinventing the Wheel to Run Myself Over" was heavily inspired by the band Lifetime. Following the song's conclusion, De'Mar Hamilton of Plain White T's can be heard singing the song's refrain while laughing. "The Patron Saint of Liars and Fakes" was composed in drop D and provides a "dark ending" to the record. Stump wrote it just outside his vocal range, and found it difficult to sing while recording, as he was not a singer before joining the band. It was intended as a foreshadowing of the sound the band intended to use on their next record. (The song that opens their second album, "Our Lawyers Made Us Change The Name of This Song So We Wouldn't Get Sued", is also composed in drop D).

== Artwork ==
The blue-tinted cover of Take This to Your Grave features the band's four members—left to right, Pete Wentz, Andy Hurley, Patrick Stump and Joe Trohman—sitting on a couch with their names printed above, in a nod to classic Blue Note jazz records. The futon pictured in the photograph was actually broken in the middle and contributed to the members' close proximity. The exposed brick wall was part of what Wentz described as "the worst apartment of all time". The photo was simply a promotional photo taken during the album's promotional cycle, although Stump wanted a live photo on the cover. It was originally intended to be used on the back cover, and left one unnamed member of the band "pissed about it forever". In addition, not every member was keen on having their names printed on the cover, as it was very uncommon for modern albums. Wentz used the cover in an effort to reject the notion that the group was all about him, and to demonstrate that the four members mattered as a team. "Pete had always wanted to create a culture with the band where it was about all four guys and not just one guy," remembered Stump.

Ryan Bakerink was the album's photographer shooting both the rejected and final cover. The band stripped Wentz's bedroom, the largest, and filled it with items from each member's room to create the set. "In hindsight, I kind of feel like the rest of the band just let Pete do all of the heavy lifting. It was exhausting. We were carrying beds and dressers and all these things into the other room, and we were just soaked in sweat," Bakerink recalled. He had had a lengthy conversation with Stump about Stump's love for Elvis Costello, and found an Armed Forces LP of Stump's sitting out, strategically placing it in the image to play it off as Stump's. As the band was "rooted in nostalgia from early on", the photograph was filled with 1980s toys and cereals. The photo went through several versions, with one idea involving the bed sheet pulled back, as if somebody had got out of bed and left a letter to someone. As the album title had yet to be finalized, they did two shots of a sealed envelope, one with the alternate title To My Favorite Liar and one with Take This to Your Grave. Eventually, Wentz suggested they use his then girlfriend, lying on her back in bed, exhausted. Bakerink showed the Polaroid to Wentz, who immediately loved the shot. The photo session ran later and later, and by 2:00 am they began shooting individual member shots and what became the album cover. When it was sent to Fueled by Ramen for approval, the label responded that they "couldn't clear any of this stuff," such as posters of Cher, Morrissey and Edward Scissorhands, and images of Count Chocula and Darth Vader. When Trohman showed the new album cover to Bakerink at the album release party at the Metro, he was surprised: "It was interesting how they ended up using the last image we took that night, and I didn't even know if it was supposed to be used at all. I wound up really liking it." The original cover was eventually used for the first pressing of the album's vinyl edition.

Alternative Press called the finalized cover "the pop-punk Abbey Road", calling it "instantly recognizable, extremely identifiable and absolutely iconic in certain circles". Wentz elaborated on the selection of that particular image and not the record's original cover: "It makes me wonder: How many of these things are just accidental moments? [...] If we had a bigger budget, we probably would have ended up with a goofier cover that no one would have cared about."

== Release ==
Take This to Your Grave was released in the United States on May 6, 2003, by Fueled by Ramen. The band held a release party at Chicago venue The Metro. Previously, one of the band's earliest recordings, Evening Out with Your Girlfriend, had not been released until shortly before Grave in March 2003, when the band had gained considerable momentum. "Our record was something being rushed out to help generate some interest, but that interest was building before we could even get the record out," said Sean Muttaqi. The band actively tried to stop Uprising from releasing the recordings as the band's relationship with Muttaqi had soured. The band viewed it as a "giant piece of garbage" recorded before Hurley's involvement, and the band ceased to consider it their debut album.

Gradually, the band's fanbase grew as Fueled by Ramen pushed for the album's mainstream success. The band's popularity grew as the band "would play anywhere"; they did frequent in-store performances at retailers selling the album. While many were corporate-owned with numerous rules, some, such as Hollister, allowed the band to perform as they wanted. One performance at a Hollister store in a mall in Schaumburg, Illinois, the band's merchandise manager took a decorative surfboard off a wall and began crowd surfing during the band's final song. According to Wentz, shows began to end in a near-riot, and the group were banned from several venues because the entire crowd would end up onstage. The band garnered positive reviews for subsequent gigs at South by Southwest (SXSW) and various tour appearances. They joined the Warped Tour for five dates in the summer of 2004, and on one date the band had only performed three songs when the stage collapsed due to the large crowd (the band finished with an a capella rendition "Where Is Your Boy" with the audience). Many of the more established bands were angry at the new "up-and-comers" stealing the spotlight. The band was photographed for the cover of the August 2004 edition of Alternative Press, and listening stations at Hot Topic partially helped the album move 2,000-3,000 copies per week by Christmas 2004, at which point the Fueled by Ramen label considered the band "tipping" into mainstream success. Prior to signing with Island, Take This to Your Grave had sold 200,000–300,000 copies, considered outstanding for an independent album.

In 2005, a second single "Grand Theft Autumn/Where Is Your Boy" peaked at number 84 on the now-defunct Billboard Pop 100. The album was re-released in January 2005 as Take This to Your Grave: Director's Cut for a run of 5000 copies, featuring a dance remix and a cover of The Police's "Roxanne", along with enhanced CD footage of the band commentating and breaking down each song, and the music video for "Saturday". In 2006, Take This to Your Grave was certified gold by the Recording Industry Association of America for shipments of 500,000 copies, and had sold over 553,000 copies by January 2007. By the week ending August 24, 2008, Take This to Your Grave passed 634,000 sales according to Billboard. In 2013, the album was certified gold British Phonographic Industry for over 100,000 shipments.

== Reception and legacy ==
Professional ratings
Review scores
Source	Rating
AllMusic	4.5/5 stars
Alternative Press	4/5 stars
Punknews.org	3/5 stars
The Rolling Stone Album Guide	2/5 stars
Scene Point Blank	8/10

Johnny Loftus of AllMusic described the album as a "spectacular debut art project", calling it "a smart collection of emo-influenced pop-punk tunes". Rolling Stone wrote that "FOB show[s] a knack for mixing caffeinated, up-tempo tunes with sensitive, tortured lyrics [...] Overall, it's the run-of-the-mill stuff you'd hear from just about any other Warped Tour act."

Retrospective reviews have been very positive. Alternative Press called the album a "subcultural touchstone", describing it as "a magical, transcendent and deceptively smart pop-punk masterpiece that ushered in a vibrant scene resurgence with a potent combination of charisma, new media marketing and hardcore-punk urgency". The band expanded upon their evaluation, writing, "There's no overstating the impact Take This to Your Grave has had on not only the scene (and eventually mainstream culture) [...] it represents a zeitgeist that launched untold numbers of bands to pick up some musical gear, make noise in their garages and actively participate in this culture. The fact that the album continues to resonate with generations in the years following is a testament to its longevity." Rolling Stone placed the album at number 5 on their "50 Greatest Pop-Punk Albums" list, writing that Take This To Your Grave "ushered in a whole new, genre-blurring scene, in which heavy riffs and a screamo aesthetic mingled with old-fashioned teen heartbreak". Gigwise called the album "an almost flawless slice of pop-punk [...] The record had just the right amount of sincerity, cynicism and slick pop-culture references — it didn't matter if you were 14 or 24, TTTYG would appeal to the streak of teenage bitterness inside all of us."

In 2025, Collider placed the album at the top of its list of "10 Pop-Punk Albums That Are Amazing From Start to Finish". Staff writer Janelle Sheetz wrote: "Fall Out Boy was easily one of the biggest successes to come out of the pop-punk scene of the early 2000s, and it’s hard to imagine that success without Take This to Your Grave. While the band blew up with From Under the Cork Tree, Take This to Your Grave is packed with songs that are just as good, with a blend of catchy hooks with great guitar riffs which perfectly demonstrate how pop punk got its name."

=== Rankings ===
Take This to Your Grave on select critic rankings
Publication	Country	Accolade	Year	Rank
BuzzFeed	United States	36 Pop Punk Albums You Need To Hear Before You F——ing Die	2014	9
Rolling Stone	United States	The 50 Greatest Pop-Punk Albums	2017	5
Rock Sound	United Kingdom	The 51 Most Essential Pop Punk Albums of All Time	2014	7
Kerrang!	United Kingdom	51 Greatest Pop Punk Albums Ever	2015	11

== Commercial performance ==
Take This to Your Grave debuted on the US Billboard Heatseeker Albums chart at No. 31 on the week ending March 6, 2004, almost a year after its initial May 2003 release, and peaked at No. 11 the week ending January 15, 2005, almost a year later. It spent twenty-eight weeks on the chart in total. After its first three weeks, at No. 31, No. 41 and No. 22, the album fell off the chart and re-entered four months later at No. 29, falling out after nine more weeks. Three months later it re-entered at No. 37, then rose to No. 34 the following week peaking at No. 11 It then logged another eight weeks below No. 20. Again, it fell off and shortly re-entered at No. 43, inching up to No. 42 before dropping off and re-entering at No. 48. It spent its last week on the chart two years after its initial release at No. 47 the week ending May 14, 2005. The band's follow-up release From Under the Cork Tree debuted at No. 9 on the Billboard 200 the following week, which made the band ineligible to chart on the Heatseeker Albums chart any longer. In February 2006, Take This to Your Grave reached No. 96 on the UK albums chart.

== Track listing ==
All lyrics are written by Pete Wentz and Patrick Stump; all music is composed by Fall Out Boy.

No.	Title	Length
1.	""Tell That Mick He Just Made My List of Things to Do Today""	3:30
2.	"Dead on Arrival"	3:14
3.	"Grand Theft Autumn/Where Is Your Boy"	3:11
4.	"Saturday"	3:36
5.	"Homesick at Space Camp"	3:08
6.	"Sending Postcards from a Plane Crash (Wish You Were Here)"	2:56
7.	"Chicago Is So Two Years Ago"	3:19
8.	"The Pros and Cons of Breathing"	3:21
9.	"Grenade Jumper" (featuring Jeff Warren)	2:58
10.	"Calm Before the Storm"	4:27
11.	"Reinventing the Wheel to Run Myself Over"	2:21
12.	"The Patron Saint of Liars and Fakes"	3:19
Total length:		39:24

First pressing vinyl bonus track
No.	Title	Length
13.	"Grand Theft Autumn / Where Is Your Boy" (dance remix)	3:48
Total length:		43:12

Director's Cut bonus tracks
No.	Title	Writer(s)	Length
13.	"Roxanne" (The Police cover)	Sting	3:11
14.	"Grand Theft Autumn / Where Is Your Boy" (dance remix)		3:48
Total length:			46:23

20th anniversary edition bonus tracks
No.	Title	Length
13.	"Untitled 1 (Colorado Song)" (unfinished demo)	3:24
14.	"Untitled 2 (Jakus Song)" (unfinished demo)	3:18

== Personnel ==
Fall Out Boy

- Patrick Stump – vocals, guitar
- Pete Wentz – bass guitar, backing vocals, unclean vocals on tracks 1, 4, 8, 10, 12
- Joe Trohman – guitar, backing vocals
- Andy Hurley – drums, percussion

Additional musicians

- Justin Pierre – backing vocals on "Chicago Is So Two Years Ago"
- Jeff Warren – backing vocals on "Grenade Jumper"

Artwork

- Mike Joyce – booklet concept and design
- Kyle Baker – jewel case layout
- Nicholas Scimeca – O-card design
- Ryan Bakerink – photography

Production

- Sean O'Keefe – production, engineering, mixing
- Greg Geary – Pro Tools engineering
- Mike Harl – additional Pro Tools engineering
- Todd Osterag – assistant engineer at Smart Studios
- Noble Hibbs – assistant engineer at Gravity Studios
- Paul Long – assistant engineer at Gravity Studios
- Dominick Maita – mastering

== Charts ==
Chart performance for Take This to Your Grave
Chart (2004–2021)	Peak position
Hungarian Albums (MAHASZ)	26
UK Albums (Official Charts)	96
US Billboard 200	140
US Heatseekers Albums (Billboard)	11
US Independent Albums (Billboard)	17
US Top Catalog Albums (Billboard)	10

== Certifications ==
Certifications for Take This to Your Grave
Region	Certification	Certified units/sales
United Kingdom (BPI)	Gold	100,000^{^}
United States (RIAA)	Gold	500,000^{^}
^{^} Shipments figures based on certification alone.
