= Grand Theft Autumn/Where Is Your Boy =

Single by Fall Out Boy

from the album Take This to Your Grave
- Released: August 4, 2003; October 27, 2003 (UK)
- Recorded: 2003
- Genre: Pop-punk; emo
- Length: 3:12
- Label: Fueled by Ramen
- Composer(s): Pete Wentz; Patrick Stump; Joe Trohman; Andy Hurley
- Lyricist(s): Pete Wentz; Patrick Stump
- Producer(s): Sean O'Keefe

Fall Out Boy singles chronology
"Dead on Arrival" (2003)	"Grand Theft Autumn/Where Is Your Boy" (2003)	"Saturday" (2003)

"Grand Theft Autumn/Where Is Your Boy" is a song by American rock band Fall Out Boy and the second single (first in the UK) released from their 2003 album, Take This to Your Grave. The breakthrough mainstream success that the band received with their follow-up album From Under the Cork Tree (2005) strengthened the song's popularity and helped it reach No. 84 on the now-defunct US Billboard Pop 100 chart. It has also drawn in a large amount of digital downloads.

The single was released on yellow vinyl and on a split with UK band My Awesome Compilation. An acoustic version of the song was released on the 2004 EP My Heart Will Always Be the B-Side to My Tongue, and a new dance remix (Millennium version) of the song was included in the 2005 re-release of Take This to Your Grave: Director's Cut.

The lyrics deal with jealousy and unrequited love. Both Patrick Stump and Pete Wentz disliked "Grand Theft Autumn/Where Is Your Boy" during the recording process; Stump particularly disliked the a cappella opening, which was producer Sean O'Keefe's idea. The title of the song was taken, without permission, from a Braid song, and subsequently, the name of the record label started by Braid members, Roy Ewing and Todd Bell.

"Grand Theft Autumn" was referenced, among many other Fall Out Boy songs, on their 2008 album Folie à Deux track "What a Catch, Donnie", featuring Gabe Saporta of Cobra Starship and Midtown singing the chorus of the song. The song remains a Fall Out Boy concert staple.

== Music video ==
The video, directed by Dale "Rage" Resteghini begins with a close-up of vocalist/guitarist Patrick Stump as he begins to sing, then cuts to show the rest of the band performing outdoors in the snow. Throughout the rest of the video, shots of the band are interlaced with the storyline of the video. The storyline depicts a boy with a hand-held camera walking in the woods. He reaches a house and hangs around for a small period of time. A girl wakes up and notices him. She begins to get dressed. He then records her while she puts on her clothes. She looks out the window at the boy, causing him to get scared and run away. He reaches his van and opens the door, only to find the girl is inside, and they begin to make out. The last the girl is seen is when she smiles at the boy. The video ends with a close-up of Patrick Stump. The video was shot in a cabin on the Muskegon River owned by Myron of the Dirty Americans. The stalker boy in the video is played by Jeremiah Pilbeam, also of the Dirty Americans. The girl is played by actress/dancer Leila Mahadin.

The boy and the girl from the video also appear in the band's 2006 "This Ain't a Scene, It's an Arms Race" music video, at bassist Pete Wentz's "funeral".

== Certifications ==
Region	Certification	Certified units/sales
United States (RIAA)	Platinum	1,000,000^{‡}
^{‡} Sales+streaming figures based on certification alone.
