= Genevieve (musician) =

American singer-songwriter (born 1987)

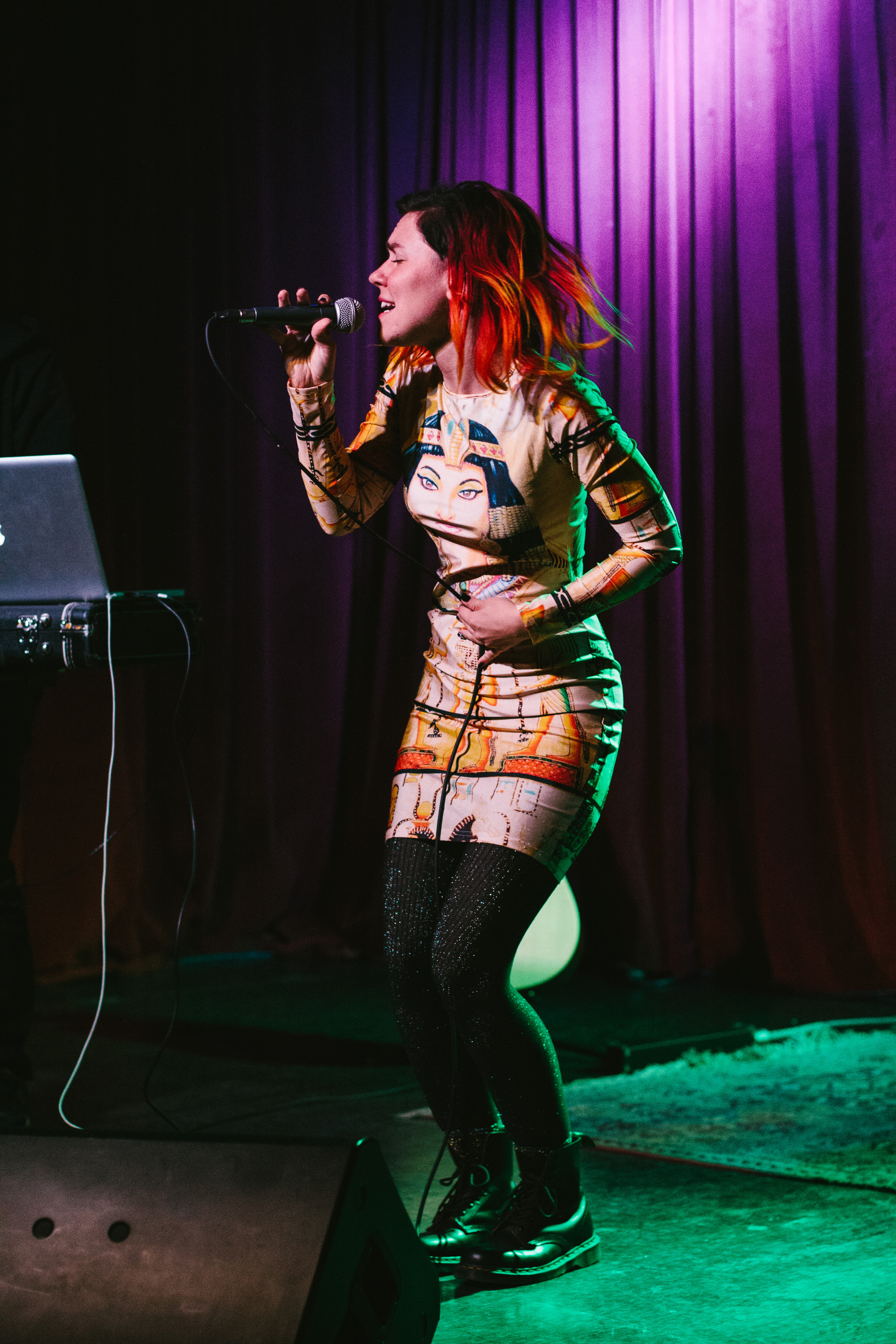

Background information
- Born: Genevieve Schatz; April 1, 1987 (age 38)
- Origin: Chicago, Illinois, U.S.
- Genres: Alternative, Indie pop, Indie, pop
- Years active: 2007–present
- Labels: Wind-up Records
- Website: www.facebook.com/HelloGenevieve

Genevieve Schatz (born April 1, 1987), better known mononymously as Genevieve, is an American indie pop singer and songwriter from Elgin, Illinois, United States. Schatz is the frontwoman of Chicago indie rock band Company of Thieves and embarked on her solo career as Genevieve in early 2014. Her first solo track, "Show Your Colors", premiered on Vice Noisey in December 2014. Her debut EP Show Your Colors was released on March 10, 2015, via Wind-up Records.

== History with Company of Thieves ==
Company of Thieves won the 2007 New York Songwriters Circle contest for their song "Oscar Wilde" and signed with Wind-up Records in October 2008. The band's debut album Ordinary Riches debuted on the US Heatseekers Albums Chart at number five.

Company of Thieves were featured as an iTunes Discovery Download for their song "Oscar Wilde", as well as in their Indie Spotlight: Rock/Alternative – featuring the album alongside the recommended track "Pressure". "Oscar Wilde" was also featured on Gossip Girl: Real NY Stories Revealed as part of the Dove Go Fresh campaign, as well as being aired during an episode of Gossip Girl.

In January 2009, Genevieve appeared on Live from Daryl's House, with Marc Walloch of Company of Thieves, playing several songs including a sultry cover of "Time of the Season", "Pressure", "Even in the Dark" and a belting version of "Piece of My Heart". She also performed with the band on Last Call with Carson Daly in February 2009. Company of Thieves' second album, Running from a Gamble, was released on May 17, 2011, and debuted at number 97 on the Billboard 200.

On May 21, 2017, Company of Thieves confirmed their reunion tour in September 2017. and on July 28, 2017, a new single entitled "Treasure" was released. An 11-city tour ran from Tuesday, September 12 in Indianapolis to September 30 in Los Angeles. According to an interview with Walloch on axs.com, the band intended to work on writing music for new singles and EPs after the reunion tour finished, and future tours would follow.

== Discography ==
=== EPs ===
Album	Year	Label
Show Your Colors	2015	Wind-Up Records
Heaven Is Real	2020	Forever Camping

=== Singles ===
Single	Album	Year	Label
"Show Your Colors"	Show Your Colors	2014	Wind-Up Records
"Show Your Colors (PLS&TY Remix)"	Single	2015	Wind-Up Records

=== Other ===
Album	Year	Label
Genevieve on Audiotree Live	2015	Audiotree Music
