= A Little Less Sixteen Candles, a Little More "Touch Me" =

Single by Fall Out Boy

from the album From Under the Cork Tree
- Released: March 14, 2006
- Recorded: 2005
- Genre: Pop-punk; emo
- Length: 2:49
- Label: Island
- Composers: Pete Wentz; Patrick Stump; Joe Trohman; Andy Hurley
- Lyricist: Pete Wentz
- Producer: Neal Avron

Fall Out Boy singles chronology
"Dance, Dance" (2005)	"A Little Less Sixteen Candles, a Little More "Touch Me"" (2006)	"The Carpal Tunnel of Love" (2006)

Music video
- A Little Less Sixteen Candles, A Little More "Touch Me" on YouTube

"A Little Less Sixteen Candles, a Little More "Touch Me"" is a song by American rock band Fall Out Boy and the third and last single taken from their second studio album, From Under the Cork Tree (2005). "A Little Less Sixteen Candles, a Little More "Touch Me"" was released to radio on March 14, 2006. Though the song never reached the popularity of previous singles "Sugar, We're Goin Down" and "Dance, Dance", it received moderate playtime on both pop radio and alternative rock radio stations, peaking at No. 65 on the US Billboard Hot 100. The video also reached No. 1 on TRL on both May 5 and May 8, 2006, being the third consecutive single from the album to reach the top position.

The song was originally titled "A Little Less Molly Ringwald, a Little More Samantha Fox". Molly Ringwald is an actress who starred in the 1984 movie Sixteen Candles, referenced in the final song title. "Touch Me" is a reference to the hit song by Samantha Fox. The accompanying music video to "A Little Less Sixteen Candles, a Little More 'Touch Me'" was nominated for Best Video Inspired by a Film at the First Annual Fuse Fangoria Chainsaw Awards 2006.

== Music video ==
The extended music video, directed by Alan Ferguson, features the band members acting as a team of vampire hunters trying to fend off a gang of vampires attacking their town. It ends with a climactic showdown between the band and the vampires, resulting in Wentz being arrested and his subsequent realization that all the police officers are also vampires. Many of its scenes are parodies from various horror films; for example, the opening scene is a take-off from the film The Lost Boys and the video's style is similar to that of the Blade films. Drummer Andy Hurley can be seen wearing a Guns N' Roses T-shirt.

The video features cameos from members of several other Fueled by Ramen/Decaydance bands as vampires, including William Beckett and Michael Carden of The Academy Is..., Brendon Urie and Spencer Smith of Panic! at the Disco, and Travie McCoy of Gym Class Heroes.

== Charts ==
Chart (2006)	Peak position
UK Singles Chart	38
US Billboard Hot 100	65
US Billboard Pop Songs	33
US Billboard Alternative Songs	38

== Certifications ==
Region	Certification	Certified units/sales
United States (RIAA)	Platinum	1,000,000^{‡}
United Kingdom (BPI)	Silver	200,000^{‡}
^{‡} Sales+streaming figures based on certification alone.

== Release history ==
Release dates and formats for "A Little Less Sixteen Candles, a Little More 'Touch Me'"
Region	Date	Format	Label(s)	Ref.
United States	April 24, 2006	Mainstream airplay	Island	
