= Taking Back the Night Life =

Studio album by Liferuiner
- Released: June 24, 2008
- Genre: Metalcore
- Length: 40:34
- Label: Uprising Records/This City Is Burning
- Producer: Jamie King

Liferuiner chronology
No Saints (2007)	Taking Back the Night Life (2008)	Sons of Straight Edge EP (2011)

Taking Back the Night Life is the second full-length album by the Canadian metalcore band Liferuiner and also their first album on Uprising Records. In early April 2008, the pre-production demo tracks of the entire album were released on multiple P2P clients. The band stated in an April 19 blog that this leaked version was not the complete album and they had yet to mix, master, and rearrange some of the tracks. The band did however release the first single "MegaDEATH" on April 29 and noted that it was in fact a final, album version.

Andrea Dyer of Exclaim! gave it a negative review.

== Track listing ==
1. "A Ticket to the Pussy Crusher" - 1:01
2. "Doug Burns to Death" - 2:09
3. "You Look Better When You're Drunk" - 3:11
4. "You Use Dirt as a Metaphor for Life" - 2:19
5. "Megadeath" - 3:04
6. "Americant" - 3:39
7. "Ham Hands Lives" - 2:59
8. "Taking Back the Night Life" - 2:55
9. "Bad Rock Anthem" - 2:22
10. "Amaranthine" - 2:16
11. "Chernobyll" - 14:39 (The song "Chernobyll" lasts until 1:48. Between 1:48 and 11:50, there is silence, then the hidden track "xSMDx" plays.)
