= Tallulah =

Tallulah, Talulah, Talullah or Tallula may refer to:

== Places in the United States ==
- Tallulah, Louisiana, a city
- Tallulah (Jacksonville), Florida
- Tallula, Illinois, a village
- Tallula, Mississippi, an unincorporated community
- Tallulah Gorge, Georgia
- Tallulah Ranger District, Georgia
- Tallulah River, Georgia

== People ==
- Tallulah Bankhead (1902–1968), American actress
- Tallulah Evans (born 2000), English actress
- Tallulah Greive (born 1997), Scottish actress
- Tallulah Haddon (born 1997), British actress, drag and performance artist, and model
- Tallulah Harlech (born 1988), English fashion stylist
- Tallulah Morgan (born 1948), the main plaintiff in Morgan v. Hennigan
- Tallulah Morton (born 1991), Australian fashion model
- Talulah Riley (born 1985), British actress
- Tallulah Willis (born 1994), daughter of American actors Demi Moore and Bruce Willis
- Tallulah (DJ) (1948–2008), German-born British DJ

== Fictional characters ==
- Cousin Tallulah, from Disney's Meet the Robinsons
- Tallulah, a singer in the musical film Bugsy Malone
- Tallulah, a minor character in the Doctor Who episodes "Daleks in Manhattan" and "Evolution of the Daleks"
- Tallulah, a character that appears in the TV show Tickety Toc
- Tallulah, an anthropomorphic chick from Lucy Cousins' children's book series Maisy and show of the same name

== Music ==
- Tallulah (The Go-Betweens album), 1987
- Tallulah (Feeder album) or the title song, 2019
- "Tallulah", a song by Allo Darlin' from Europe, 2012
- "Tallulah", a song by Company of Thieves from Running from a Gamble, 2011
- "Talullah", a song by Jamiroquai from Dynamite, 2005
- "Tallulah", a song by Patrick Hernandez, 1983
- "Tallulah", a song by Sonata Arctica from Silence, 2001

== Other uses ==
- Tallulah, a 1983 Off-Broadway musical starring Helen Gallagher
- Tallulah (film), a 2016 film
- Tallulah, a one-woman show by Kathleen Turner, based on the life of Tallulah Bankhead
- USS Tallulah (AO-50), a US Navy oiler
- Tallula (moth), a moth genus

== See also ==
- Talulah Does the Hula, Irish pop band
- Talulah Gosh, English guitar-pop group
- "Talula", a song by Tori Amos, 1996
