= Dance, Dance (Fall Out Boy song) =

2005 single by Fall Out Boy

Single by Fall Out Boy

from the album From Under the Cork Tree
- Released: October 31, 2005
- Genre: Pop-punk; emo
- Length: 3:00
- Label: Island; Mercury
- Composers: Pete Wentz; Patrick Stump; Joe Trohman; Andy Hurley
- Lyricist: Pete Wentz
- Producer: Neal Avron

Fall Out Boy singles chronology
"Sugar, We're Goin Down" (2005)	"Dance, Dance" (2005)	"A Litte Less Sixteen Candles, a Little More "Touch Me"" (2006)

Music video
- "Dance, Dance" on YouTube

"Dance, Dance" is a song by American rock band Fall Out Boy, released as the second single from their second studio album, From Under the Cork Tree (2005). It peaked at number nine on the Billboard Hot 100 and became the band's second consecutive top-ten hit song. Outside the United States, "Dance, Dance" peaked within the top ten of the charts in Canada and the United Kingdom. It won many awards, including Viewer's Choice at the MTV Video Music Awards and two Teen Choice Awards, among various nominations. "Dance, Dance" has been certified 6× platinum by the RIAA since August 27, 2025.

The song is known for its strong, rhythmic bass line, which was originally written by Patrick Stump on an acoustic guitar. Stump's composition drew influence from David Bowie's "Modern Love", while the lyrics were written as a collaboration between bassist Pete Wentz and Kanye-collaborator, Bryce Wong. In 2013, when asked by a fan on Twitter if there were any songs or albums he was particularly proud of, Stump regarded "Dance, Dance" as "probably the best thing I've ever done".

== Composition ==
"Dance, Dance" has been described as a pop-punk and emo song. It was written in the key of B Minor.

== Critical reception ==
"Dance, Dance" has received critical acclaim, and is widely considered one of Fall Out Boy's greatest songs. In 2015, Billboard ranked the song number two on their list of the 10 greatest Fall Out Boy songs, and in 2021, Kerrang ranked the song number one on their list of the 20 greatest Fall Out Boy songs. Rolling Stone ranked the song No. 39 on their Best 100 Songs of 2006 list.

== Commercial performance ==
In the United States, the song peaked at number nine on the Billboard Hot 100 in January 2006, becoming the band's second consecutive top ten hit song on the chart following "Sugar, We're Goin Down". It was a crossover hit as it simultaneously went top five on both Alternative (No. 2) and Pop (No. 5) radio. The track also reached No. 6 on the now-defunct Pop 100. It was certified triple platinum by the Recording Industry Association of America (RIAA), and has sold 3,226,000 copies in the US as of February 2014. It was certified 3× platinum in 2014, the band's second song to reach that plateau.

In the United Kingdom, "Dance, Dance" peaked at number eight on the UK Singles Chart, becoming Fall Out Boy's second consecutive top ten hit song in Britain following "Sugar, We're Goin Down". On August 7, 2020, "Dance, Dance" was certified platinum by the British Phonographic Industry (BPI) for 600,000 sales and streams.

== Music video ==
The music video was directed by Alan Ferguson and was filmed at Salesian High School in the New York City commuter town of New Rochelle, Westchester County, New York. It features the band members performing at a homecoming dance, and simultaneously attending as nerdier versions of themselves, overcoming the mocking discretions by the popular students, with cameos made by Ben Jorgensen of Armor for Sleep and Travie McCoy of Gym Class Heroes. The video starts with a scene reminiscent of the beginning of "A Little Less Sixteen Candles, a Little More "Touch Me"", with the ending scene of Pete dancing a parody of Revenge of the Nerds.

The video plot continues in the "This Ain't a Scene, It's an Arms Race" video, with the school dancers as cardboard cutouts. The picture on the back of the book that Andy Hurley is reading during the scene where he is on the bleachers is also on the album From Under the Cork Tree.

The black-and-green-striped jacket Patrick wears in the video can be seen in the music video for Fall Out Boy's song "What a Catch, Donnie". Pete's date in that video is one of the attendees at his funeral in this video. She is kissing the boy of the music video for "Sugar, We're Goin Down". Katrina Bowden, best known now as Cerie in the television series 30 Rock, appears in the video as a dancer who engages Stump; along with Ben Jorgensen who married Bowden in 2013 and divorced in 2020.

== Awards and accolades ==
=== Awards ===
Year	Ceremony	Award	Result
2006
2006	MTV Video Music Awards	Viewer's Choice	Won
2006	MTV Video Music Awards	Best Group Video	Nominated
2006	MuchMusic Video Award	People's Choice: Favorite International Group	Won
2006	MuchMusic Video Award	Best International Group	Nominated
2006	Teen Choice Awards	Rock Track	Won
2006	Teen Choice Awards	Single	Won

== Track listings ==
Lyrics were written by bassist and backing vocalist Pete Wentz; music was composed by Fall Out Boy.

CD 1:

1. "Dance, Dance" – 3:00
2. ""It's Not a Side Effect of the Cocaine, I Am Thinking It Must Be Love"" – 2:11

CD 2:

1. "Dance, Dance" – 3:00
2. "A Little Less Sixteen Candles, a Little More "Touch Me"" – 2:49

7-inch vinyl:

1. "Dance, Dance" – 3:00
2. "Sugar, We're Goin Down" (Zane Lowe Session – London 2006) – 3:49

DVD:

1. "Dance, Dance" - 4:38
2. "A Little Less Sixteen Candles, A Little More "Touch Me"" - 6:40

== Charts ==
=== Weekly charts ===
Chart (2005–2006)	Peak position
Canada (Nielsen SoundScan)	3
Canada CHR/Pop Top 30 (Radio & Records)	5
Canada Rock Top 30 (Radio & Records)	8
Ireland (IRMA)	35
Scottish Singles Sales (Official Charts)	7
UK Singles (Official Charts)	8
Ukraine Airplay (TopHit)	121
US Billboard Hot 100	9
US Alternative Airplay (Billboard)	2
US Adult Pop Airplay (Billboard)	25
US Dance Club Songs (Billboard)	24
US Dance Airplay (Billboard)	19
US Pop 100 (Billboard)	6
US Pop Airplay (Billboard)	5

=== Year-end charts ===
Chart (2006)	Position
US Billboard Hot 100	33
US Modern Rock Tracks (Billboard)	9
US Pop 100 (Billboard)	23

Chart (2007)	Position
Brazil (Crowley)	90

== Certifications ==
Certifications for "Dance, Dance"
Region	Certification	Certified units/sales
Brazil (Pro-Música Brasil)	Gold	30,000^{‡}
Canada (Music Canada)	Platinum	80,000^{*}
New Zealand (RMNZ)	2× Platinum	60,000^{‡}
United Kingdom (BPI)	2× Platinum	1,200,000^{‡}
United States (RIAA)	7× Platinum	7,000,000^{‡}
^{*} Sales figures based on certification alone.^{‡} Sales+streaming figures based on certification alone.

== Release history ==
Region	Date	Format(s)	Label(s)	Ref(s).
United States	October 31, 2005	Alternative radio	Island	
United Kingdom	April 17, 2006	CD	Mercury	

== In popular culture ==
This song has been included in multiple video games; Burnout Revenge, Dance Dance Revolution SuperNova for the PS2 in North America, Guitar Hero: Warriors of Rock, Juiced: Eliminator, Madden NFL 06, Rock Band 3, Rock Revolution, SingStar Pop Hits, SingStar Rocks! in North America, and as downloadable content for Karaoke Revolution Presents American Idol Encore 2 for the PS3. It also appeared on the Brazilian and Argentinian version of Infinity on High, which is From Under the Cork Tree's 2007 follow-up. Wentz prevented Kidz Bop from singing this song on Kidz Bop 10 because of the sexual overtones to the song.
