= My Heart Will Always Be the B-Side to My Tongue =

EP including DVD by Fall Out Boy
- Released: May 18, 2004
- Length: 15:40
- Label: Fueled by Ramen
- Producer: Fall Out Boy; Sean O'Keefe

Fall Out Boy chronology
Take This to Your Grave (2003)	My Heart Will Always Be the B-Side to My Tongue (2004)	From Under the Cork Tree (2005)

My Heart Will Always Be the B-Side to My Tongue is the third EP by American rock band Fall Out Boy, released by Fueled by Ramen on May 18, 2004.

== Contents ==
The EP was released as a Digipak CD while the band was recording its major label debut album From Under the Cork Tree (2005) for Island Records. The CD is packaged with a bonus DVD, featuring the background of the band, music videos for "Dead on Arrival" and "Grand Theft Autumn/Where Is Your Boy", an acoustic performance and more extras. The CD features a total of five tracks; two new acoustic songs, two acoustic versions, and a cover. The title refers to the B-side of a gramophone record.

"Grand Theft Autumn/Where Is Your Boy", from the band's 2003 album Take This to Your Grave, was re-recorded in an acoustic version. The band's subsequent third album From Under the Cork Tree contains a version of "Nobody Puts Baby in the Corner" with electric instrumentation, and a similarly arranged demo of "My Heart is the Worst Kind of Weapon" is a bonus track on From Under the Cork Tree (Limited "Black Clouds and Underdogs" Edition). The new track "'It's Not a Side Effect of the Cocaine, I Am Thinking It Must Be Love'" takes its name from a lyric in the David Bowie song "Station to Station". A cover of the Joy Division song "Love Will Tear Us Apart" is also included. There is also hidden footage of the band on the eye of the angel in the main menu.

== Reception ==
The EP debuted at No. 153 on the Billboard 200, Fall Out Boy's first entry on that chart (their next entry week would be at No. 9 with From Under the Cork Tree). It also peaked at No. 5 on the Billboard Heatseeker Albums and No. 10 on the Billboard Independent Albums. By February 2006, the EP had sold over 79,000 copies. The artwork was designed by Jacob Bannon, vocalist of the hardcore band Converge. A Clandestine Industry Presents: Release The Bats DVD was released in 2005 with additional content not released on the My Heart... EP.

== Track listing ==
=== CD ===
All tracks written by Fall Out Boy, except for "Love Will Tear Us Apart" written by Ian Curtis, Bernard Sumner, Peter Hook, Stephen Morris

No.	Title	Length
1.	"My Heart Is the Worst Kind of Weapon"	3:22
2.	"It's Not a Side Effect of the Cocaine, I Am Thinking It Must Be Love"	2:11
3.	"Nobody Puts Baby in the Corner"	3:33
4.	"Love Will Tear Us Apart"	3:22
5.	"Grand Theft Autumn/Where Is Your Boy"	3:12
Total length:		15:40

=== DVD ===
No.	Title	Category	Length
1.	"The Band"	The Story	1:39
2.	"The Beginning"	The Story	4:30
3.	"Take This to Your Grave"	The Story	4:13
4.	"The Accident"	The Story	2:58
5.	"The Live Experience"	The Story	5:10
6.	"Upcoming Record"	The Story	6:39
7.	"Dead on Arrival"	The Videos	3:14
8.	"Grand Theft Autumn/Where Is Your Boy"	The Videos	3:15
9.	"Grenade Jumper" (acoustic)	Performances	3:10
10.	"Chicago Is So Two Years Ago" (acoustic)	Performances	3:06
11.	"Saturday" (acoustic)	Performances	4:18
12.	"The Cutting Room Floor"	The Cutting Room Floor	9:24
13.	"Slideshow"	Extras	4:59
14.	"Clandestine commercial"	Extras	0:22
15.	"Roy"	Fueled by Ramen Music	3:03
16.	"The Aka's"	Fueled by Ramen Music	2:40
17.	"Blueline Medic"	Fueled by Ramen Music	2:44
18.	"Punchline"	Fueled by Ramen Music	3:30
19.	"The Academy AD (The Academy Is...)"	Fueled by Ramen Music	5:08
20.	"Credits"	Credits	1:26
Total length:			75:28

== Clandestine Industry Presents: Release The Bats ==
A Clandestine Industry Presents: Release The Bats DVD was released in 2005, containing footage mostly shot during the making of the My Heart Will Always Be the B-Side to My Tongue DVD, but "deemed unfit". It provides a "closer look at the band's inner circle". It includes footage encompassing the early years, backstage antics, reckless stunts, and live footage of Armor for Sleep and Gym Class Heroes; it also contains clips from Fall Out Boy in Japan, the band's summer tour and the near-riot during the band's Detroit performance at Warped Tour in 2004. A clip of the short video Bedussy from Release The Bats appeared at the end of the band's 2015 music video for "Irresistible".
