= No Saints =

Studio album by Liferuiner
- Released: April 10, 2007
- Recorded: April 2006
- Studio: Wild Studio
- Genre: Metalcore
- Length: 24:34
- Label: Tribunal
- Producer: Antoine Lussier and Dan Weston

Liferuiner chronology
No Saints (2007)	Taking Back the Night Life (2008)

Professional ratings
Review scores
Source	Rating
AllMusic	3/5 stars

No Saints is the first full-length album by the Canadian straight edge hardcore punk band Liferuiner, released in 2007. This album was recorded in early 2006 by Antoine Lussier of Ion Dissonance.

== Track listing ==
No.	Title	Length
1.	"Anthem to a New Generation"	1:10
2.	"I Don't Need to Be Straight Edge to Be Better than You"	2:29
3.	"Saints and Sinners"	2:54
4.	"The Alphabet Never Really Made Sense to Me"	2:45
5.	"The Jump Off"	3:00
6.	"You Call Me Son, I Call You Dead"	2:33
7.	"You've Successfully Turned Blood Into Water"	3:02
8.	"You Have a Body Like an Hourglass, and a Face That Could Stop Time"	2:16
9.	"If Being Fake Was an Olympic Sport, You'd Be Rick Hansen"	3:03
10.	"The End of Great Things to Come"	1:22
Total length:		24:34

== Personnel ==
Liferuiner

- Jonny O'Callaghan – vocals
- Daniel Steinbok – guitar/bass
- Jose Lopez – session drums, additional vocals

Production

- Jay Scarlino – additional vocals
- Antoine Lussier – additional vocals
- Produced and Engineered by Dan Weston @ Wild Studio in April 2006
- Mixed and Mastered by Antoine Lussier (of Ion Dissonance)
