= Better than Knowing Where You Are =

Studio album by Spitalfield
- Released: October 3, 2006
- Recorded: April 21, 2006 – June 15, 2006
- Studio: Smart Studios, Madison, Wisconsin
- Genre: Alternative rock
- Label: Victory
- Producer: Matt Opal; Spitalfield

Spitalfield chronology
Stop Doing Bad Things (2005)	Better than Knowing Where You Are (2006)

Singles from Better than Knowing Where You Are
- 1. "Secrets in Mirrors" Released: January 22, 2007

Professional ratings
Review scores
Source	Rating
AbsolutePunk.net	87%
AllMusic	4/5 stars

Better than Knowing Where You Are is the fourth and final studio album from American pop-punk band Spitalfield. It was released on October 3, 2006, through Victory Records.

== Track listing ==
All songs written by Spitalfield

1. "Dare To..." - 0:24
2. "The Only Thing that Matters" - 3:16
3. "On The Floor" - 2:54
4. "Secrets in Mirrors" - 3:01
5. "Better than Knowing Where You Are" - 3:19
6. "Hold On" - 3:51
7. "Won't Back Down" - 3:40
8. "Curtain Call" - 2:51
9. "Tell Me, Clarice" - 3:39
10. "Lasting First Impression" - 3:02
11. "Novocaine" - 4:10
12. "...Listen" - 4:09

The song "Secrets in Mirrors" was included on the Sony NW-A800 as a sample track.

== Personnel ==
Credits adapted from Discogs

Spitalfield

- Dan Lowder - guitar
- JD Romero - drums
- TJ Milici - bass
- Mark Rose - vocals, guitar

Production

- Ted Jensen - mastering
- Billy Raff - engineer
- Matt Opal - producer, engineer, mixing

Design and Layout

- Chris Strong - cover art, photography
- Doublej - layout
