= Ordinary Riches =

Studio album by Company of Thieves
- Released: February 24, 2009
- Genre: Alternative rock
- Length: 59:26
- Label: Wind-Up
- Producer: Sean O'Keefe

Company of Thieves chronology
| Ordinary Riches (2009) | Running from a Gamble (2011) |

Professional ratings
Review scores
| Source | Rating |
|---|---|
| AllMusic | 2.5/5 stars |

Ordinary Riches is the first album by the American rock band Company of Thieves. It was released on February 24, 2009, by Wind-up Records and debuted at No.162 on the U.S. Billboard 200 chart and No. 5 on the Top Heatseekers chart. The single "Oscar Wilde", despite being moderately successful on American alternative radio, failed to chart on the Billboard Alternative Songs chart.

== Track listing ==
All lyrics are written by Company of Thieves

| No. | Title | Length |
|---|---|---|
| 1. | "Old Letters" | 5:41 |
| 2. | "In Passing" | 3:56 |
| 3. | "Oscar Wilde" | 4:41 |
| 4. | "Quiet on the Front" | 5:16 |
| 5. | "Pressure" | 4:40 |
| 6. | "Around the Block" | 3:37 |
| 7. | "Even in the Dark" | 4:44 |
| 8. | "Under the Umbrella" | 5:56 |
| 9. | "Past the Sleep" | 4:50 |
| 10. | "The Fire Song" | 4:04 |
| 11. | "The Tornado Song" | 4:58 |
| 12. | "New Letters" | 6:42 |

== Chart performance ==
| Chart (2009) | Peak position |
|---|---|
| U.S. Billboard 200 | 162 |
| U.S. Billboard Top Heatseekers | 5 |

== Personnel ==
- Genevieve Schatz – vocals
- Marc Walloch – guitar
- Mike Ortiz – drums
- Dorian Duffy – bass guitar
