= Saturday (Fall Out Boy song) =

Single by Fall Out Boy

from the album Take This to Your Grave
- Released: December 21, 2003; May 3, 2004 (UK)
- Recorded: 2003
- Genre: Pop-punk; emo
- Length: 3:40
- Label: Fueled by Ramen
- Composers: Pete Wentz; Patrick Stump; Joe Trohman; Andy Hurley
- Lyricists: Pete Wentz; Patrick Stump
- Producer: Sean O'Keefe

Fall Out Boy singles chronology
"Grand Theft Autumn/Where Is Your Boy" (2003)	"Saturday" (2003)	"Sugar, We're Goin Down" (2005)

Music video
- "Saturday" on YouTube

"Saturday" is a song by American rock band Fall Out Boy, released in 2003 as the third single from their debut album Take This to Your Grave. The song is still incorporated into the band's set lists and is almost always played last at the group's shows. This is one of two singles by Fall Out Boy to feature bassist Pete Wentz's screams, heard in the background of the final chorus; the other song is "The Carpal Tunnel of Love", released in 2006.

== Music video ==
The video features all of the band, but particularly frontman Patrick Stump and Pete Wentz. Pete is killing the other band members and their friends, leaving a Queen of Hearts playing card with each of the bodies. Patrick is a detective tracking the "killer". During the bridge of the song, Patrick and Pete are seen in the same position, sitting on a bed with a wall of pictures of Pete's victims in the background, suggesting that Patrick and Pete may be the same person. In the end, Pete kills Patrick, but because Pete and Patrick turn out to be the same person, Pete dies as well.

The video is intertwined with clips of the band playing a show. In the Believers Never Die DVD commentary, the band members said that the moshing and slam dancing were to Hatebreed, not actually Fall Out Boy.

== Legacy ==
The members of the band have stated that this song is one of their favorites, and typically finish every live show with it; during most live performances Pete Wentz hands his bass to a support musician during the breakdown to perform the screaming parts in the final chorus. It is regarded as a fan favorite at concerts. "Saturday" was included as the third track on the band's 2009 compilation Believers Never Die – Greatest Hits .
