= Project Rocket / Fall Out Boy =

2002 EP by Project Rocket and Fall Out Boy

EP by Project Rocket/Fall Out Boy
- Released: May 28, 2002
- Recorded: Madison, Wisconsin
- Genres: Pop-punk; emo
- Length: 17:51
- Label: Uprising
- Producer: Jared Logan

Project Rocket chronology
Project Rocket / Fall Out Boy (2002)	New Year's Revolution (2003)

Fall Out Boy chronology
Project Rocket / Fall Out Boy (2002)	Fall Out Boy's Evening Out with Your Girlfriend (2003)

Re-release cover

Project Rocket/Fall Out Boy is a split EP by American rock bands Project Rocket and Fall Out Boy, released by Uprising Records in 2002. It was the first official release for both bands. The split EP has sold 25,000 copies in the United States as of August 2008, according to Billboard.

== Background ==
This would be the first album for members of Fall Out Boy and Project Rocket to be done away from the hardcore style as opposed to their previous bands, though it still contains certain hardcore influences. Jared Logan played the drums for Fall Out Boy in the recording. Andy Hurley, the drummer for Project Rocket at the time, later agreed to drum part-time for Fall Out Boy before eventually joining full-time, after some lineup changes were made.

== Re-releases ==
The tracks were reversed in the 2005 re-release of the album. Project Rocket's tracks came first, followed by those of Fall Out Boy. There is also a reprint which features the front cover of the re-release, although without the "split ep" title; the track numbering on the case and CD are the same as the re-release but the tracks on the CD play in the order of the original pressing. Also, the track "Growing Up" is listed as "Growing" on top of the disc.

Fall Out Boy would later re-record their three songs from the EP for their following mini-LP Fall Out Boy's Evening Out with Your Girlfriend. Project Rocket also re-recorded "You Charlatan" for their album New Year's Revolution.

== Track listing ==
Tracks 1–3 were written and arranged by Project Rocket; tracks 4–6 were written and arranged by Fall Out Boy.

No.	Title	Length
1.	"Formula for Love"	2:31
2.	"You Charlatan"	3:14
3.	"Someday"	2:31
4.	"Growing Up"	2:53
5.	"Switchblades and Infidelity"	3:13
6.	"Moving Pictures"	3:33
Total length:		17:55

== Personnel ==
Adapted from liner notes

Fall Out Boy

- Pete Wentz – bass guitar, backing vocals
- T.J. Kunasch – rhythm guitar
- Patrick Stump – lead vocals
- Joe Trohman – lead guitar

Additional musicians:

- Jared Logan – drums, production

Project Rocket

- T.J. Minich – lead vocals, rhythm guitar
- Seth Lingebrigston – guitar
- Andy Hurley – drums
- Kyle Johnson – bass guitar, backing vocals
