= Project Rocket =

American pop punk band

- Origin: Chicago, Illinois, United States
- Genres: Pop punk; emo
- Years active: 2002–2003
- Label: Uprising
- Past members: Andy Hurley; T. J. Minich; Kyle Johnson; Noah Nickel; Seth Lingebrigston
- Website: Official Website

Project Rocket was an American pop punk band from Chicago, Illinois, formed in 2002. The band consisted of members Andy Hurley, T.J. Minich, Kyle Johnson, Noah Nickel and Seth Lingebrigtson. The members originally played in hardcore, political metalcore and punk rock bands such as Racetraitor, Spitalfield, 7 Angels 7 Plagues, Knockout, killtheslavemaster, The Kill Pill and Vegan Reich before forming Project Rocket to develop their own pop punk and emo sound.

In 2002, the band's first release was a split extended play with Fall Out Boy entitled Project Rocket / Fall Out Boy split EP. They released their only full-length album, New Year's Revolution, in 2003.

Following the band's breakup in 2003, drummer Andy Hurley joined Fall Out Boy shortly before they released their first full-length album, Take This to Your Grave. Seth's full name is actually "Seth Ingebrigtson", but is spelled "Lingebrigtson" on all articles about the band.

== Discography ==
Studio albums

- New Year's Revolution. January 28, 2003, Uprising Records

EPs

- Project Rocket / Fall Out Boy EP. May 28, 2002, Uprising Records
