= Liferuiner =

Canadian metalcore band

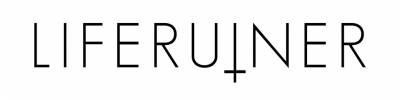
- old Liferuiner logo

Background information
- Origin: Greater Toronto Area, Canada
- Genres: Srscore, metalcore, melodic hardcore
- Years active: 2004-2016
- Labels: Tribunal, Rise, Uprising/This City Is Burning, Transcend, InVogue
- Members: Jonny O'Callaghan; Burton Lavery; Mike Short; Terrance Pettitt; Cole Hardy
- Website: facebook.com/weareliferuiner myspace.com/therealliferuiner

Liferuiner was a Canadian straight edge metalcore group from Greater Toronto Area, formed in 2004.

In August 2008, a new lineup appeared going under the name xLIFERUINERx (which had been the Canadian band's name when they first started out). This lineup had an entirely unrelated group of members based out of upstate New York–fans would thus refer to this group as 'Liferuiner US' in a method of distinguishing between the two entities, which for certain periods of time co-existed in tumultuous fashion. This version of the band has since disbanded.

In early 2010, the Canadian incarnation of Liferuiner, fronted by original member and vocalist Jonny O'Callaghan, announced a return. Since that time the band has released the Sons of Straight Edge EP, 2013's Future Revisionists under InVogue Records and the NOMADS EP in 2016.

== History ==
The band was originally created to make a sort of joke against mainstream straight edge bands by writing lyrics about hate and death rather than preaching their lifestyle. They played its first show on July 16 in Waterdown, Ontario, coming on as a guest surprise after a Numbers, Revolt set.

The band did not play again until later that fall when Jonny returned from touring with The End. The next show took place at the Rockit Club with Ion Dissonance. The band recorded a live demo at this show which was to be the first demo released to the public.

From July 22 to August 27, 2005, Liferuiner embarked on their first major tour, "Mission:Prohibition 2005", accompanied by fellow Ontario metalcore band In This Defiance. The month-long tour took them from central Canada to western Canada, then down the West Coast of the United States, through the Mid-West and back up through the East Coast. Both bands were unsigned at the time and were on tour promoting their demo CDs and apparel.

Liferuiner signed a one-record deal with Tribunal Records for the distribution of No Saints. In June 2007, the band announced a deal with Rise Records, but were suddenly dropped from the label's roster after little more than a month's time. The group pressed onwards and signed a one-record deal with Uprising Records, which culminated in the recording and release of the album Taking Back The Night Life in 2008.

O'Callaghan, the sole original member remaining, left the group in mid 2008. In a move initiated by the label, tour manager Greg Moore copyrighted the band name and all the songs so that he could continue managing the outfit regardless of who comprised it. Eventually, he also kicked out the remaining Canadian members and replaced them all with members from the US.

The Liferuiner US line-up announced in August 2008 that they had signed a multi-album deal with Uprising Records, and that a new album was to be released in March 2009, although no recorded material ever actually materialized from this group. Liferuiner US employed a 'revolving-door' line-up (bordering on hundreds of past members) earning them a sense of comedic infamy amongst previous fans of the band. The group went through a number of teased break-ups, before quietly ceasing operations for good in 2010. Earlier in the same year, O'Callaghan had announced a reformation of the Canadian version of the band, thus leaving them as the sole (and seen by many as the rightful) lineup of Liferuiner once again and toured across the country playing with bands such as Doom Cannon and Gates.

In 2011, Liferuiner embarked upon a completely different approach to their music with more serious lyrics and melodic instrumentation. The band released the Sons of Straight Edge EP in December 2011, which was an attempted rebirth for the band, and their first release since Taking Back the Night Life. These stylistic alterations were elaborated on in a series of videos entitled "Through the Eyes of," featuring O'Callaghan describing changes in his attitude and his desire to write more meaningful music. He now sings about the things that matter to him such as LGBT rights and humanitarianism. The new musical direction has been rumored to be influenced by bassist Burton Lavery's arrival in July 2011.

In 2013, Liferuiner signed a deal with InVogue Records, and would later release their third full-length Future Revisionists.

In January 2016, the band released the NOMADS EP and seemed to have disbanded since.

== Final members ==
- Jonny O'Callaghan - Vocals (2004–2016)
- Burton Lavery - Bass (2011–2016)
- Mike Short - Guitar (2012–2016)
- Terrance Pettitt - Drums (2012–2016)
- Cole Hardy - Guitar/ Backing Vocal (2014–2016)
- Scott Downes - Lights (2012–2014)

== Past members ==
- Daniel DeFonce - Guitar
- Ian Norum - Guitar
- Kevin "mothface" Yateman - Guitar
- Stephen Grande- Guitar
- Reid Maclean - Guitar
- Andrew "Fandy" Whiting - Drums
- Eric Marshall - Guitar
- Shae Alexander - Drums

== Discography ==
=== Studio albums ===
- Are You Offended Yet? Demo EP - (2004)
- No Saints - (2007)
- Taking Back the Night Life - (2008)
- Sons of Straight Edge (2011) (EP)
- Future Revisionists - (2013)
- Nomads - (2016) (EP)
