= Remember Right Now =

Studio album by Spitalfield
- Released: June 17, 2003
- Studio: Smart Studios, Madison, Wisconsin and New Trier High School, Winnetka, Illinois
- Genre: Pop punk; alternative rock; emo
- Label: Victory
- Producer: Sean O'Keefe

Spitalfield chronology
| Faster Crashes Harder (2001) | Remember Right Now (2003) | Stop Doing Bad Things (2005) |

Professional ratings
Review scores
| Source | Rating |
|---|---|
| AllMusic | 4/5 stars |
| AbsolutePunk.net | 91% |

Remember Right Now is the second album by the American band Spitalfield, released on June 17, 2003, through Victory. The entire album was featured in the video game Amped 2 for Xbox. The album would mark a point where the band would leave their homes behind to tour in support of their newfound success; they collectively felt that Remember Right Now captured a point where they were at in their lives which was to serve as a keepsake for those moments. The album artwork features photos of various locations in the city of Chicago as well as the Chicago suburbs and their respective timestamps ranging from March 1, 2003 to March 20, 2003.

The song "Stolen From Some Great Writer" was included on the 2014 video game Watch Dogs.

In 2025, Stephen Andrew Galiher of Vice included the album in his list of "4 Underrated Emo Albums From the 2000s That Deserve More Love Today".

== Track listing ==
- All songs written by Spitalfield
1. "Those Days You Felt Alive" – 3:50
2. "Kill the Drama" – 3:12
3. "Five Days and Counting" – 3:04
4. "I Loved the Way She Said 'L.A.'" – 3:19
5. "Stolen from Some Great Writer" – 4:05
6. "In the Same Lifetime" – 5:18
7. "Am I Ready?" – 3:44
8. "Fairweather Friend" – 2:46
9. "You Can't Stop" – 4:07
10. "Make My Heart Attack" – 3:24

== Personnel ==
Credits adapted from Discogs

Spitalfield

- J.D. Romero - drums
- T.J. Minich - bass guitar, vocals
- Daniel Lowder - guitar, vocals
- Mark Rose - vocals, guitar

Production

- Sean O'Keefe - production, engineering, mixing, programming
- Greg Geary - pro-tools engineer
- Mike Hari - assistant pro-tools engineer
- Todd Ostertag - assistant engineer
- Dominick Maita - mastering
- Eric Remschneider - cello, cello arrangement

Design and layout

- Jason Link - CD layout
- Chris Strong - photography
