= Faster Crashes Harder =

Studio album by Spitalfield
- Released: 2001
- Recorded: 2000
- Genre: Alternative rock
- Label: Sinister Label / Walk in Cold Records
- Producer: Spitalfield

Spitalfield chronology
Faster Crashes Harder (2001)	Remember Right Now (2003)

Faster Crashes Harder is the first album recorded by American pop-punk band Spitalfield, released in 2001. It was re-released in 2004 through Sinister Label/Walk in Cold Records.

== Track listing ==
1. "16:49 Army Time"
2. "Off to the Shoulder"
3. "Arbor Lane"
4. "Wishing Well"
5. "Track Five"
6. "Line Jumper"
7. "Don't Say I"
8. "Plastic Stars"
9. "First on a Long Left"
10. "Sincerely, Empty"
11. "Spiral Staircase"

== Personnel ==
Adapted via Discogs.

Spitalfield

- Mark Rose – vocals, guitar, piano
- J.D. Romero – drums
- Scott Morrow – vocals, guitar
- Terry Hahin – bass

Production

- Spitalfield – producer, engineer, mixing
- Steve Versaw – engineer

Design and artwork

- Eric Snyder, Spitalfield – layout
- Todd Carter – mastering
