= Sean O'Keefe (producer) =

American drummer

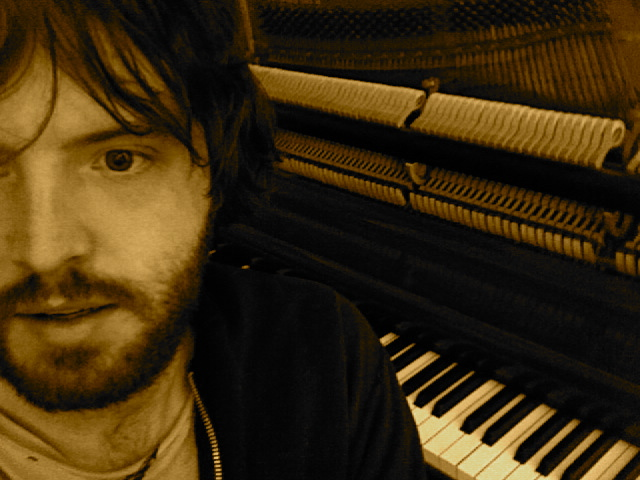

Background information
- Born: Sean Patrick O'Keefe; March 1980 (age 46)
- Origin: Chicago, Illinois, United States
- Genres: Indie rock; pop rock; pop-punk; emo; alternative rock
- Occupations: Record producer; record mixer; session musician
- Instrument: Drums
- Years active: 2002–present
- Website: https://www.rosecrud.com/

Sean O'Keefe is an American record producer, mixer, and engineer based in Chicago, Illinois, United States. O'Keefe is best known for his work with Fall Out Boy, Hawthorne Heights, Til Morning and Plain White T's, and has also worked with artists such as Motion City Soundtrack, The Hush Sound, Less Than Jake, Company of Thieves, Punchline, Spitalfield, and You vs Yesterday. He graduated from New Trier High School.

O'Keefe is also a musician, having been a member of Chicago bands This Is Me Smiling and Danny and The Ketchups, in both of which he played the drums.

== Commercial success ==
O'Keefe's work has earned him three RIAA Gold Records (awarded for the shipment of 500,000 units): Fall Out Boy's Take This to Your Grave (producer and mixer), Hawthorne Heights' The Silence in Black and White (producer and mixer), and the Plain White T's "Hey There Delilah" (co-producer and mixer). "Hey There Delilah" reached #1 on the US Billboard Hot 100.

== Selected production discography ==
Year	Artist	Title	Label	Role	Achievements
2002	Knockout	Searching For Solid Ground	Fearless Records	Producer, Mixer, Engineer	
2003	Split Habit	Put Your Money Where Your Mouth Is	Double Zero Records	Producer, Mixer, Engineer	
2003	As Tall As Lions	Lafcadio	Triple Crown Records	Producer, Mixer, Engineer	
2003	Spitalfield	Remember Right Now	Victory Records	Producer, Mixer, Engineer	
2003	Motion City Soundtrack	Schatzi Split	Doghouse Records	Producer, Mixer, Engineer	
2003	Fall Out Boy	Take This To Your Grave	Fueled By Ramen	Producer, Mixer, Engineer	700,000 sold, RIAA certified gold
2004	Duvall	Oh Holy Night	Asian Man Records	Mixer	
2004	Punchline	Action	Fueled By Ramen	Producer, Mixer, Engineer	
2004	Motion City Soundtrack	Matchbook Romance Split	Epitaph Records	Producer, Mixer, Engineer	
2004	Less Than Jake	B Is for B-sides	Warner Bros. Records	Mixer	
2004	Hawthorne Heights	The Silence in Black and White	Victory Records	Producer, Mixer, Engineer	950,000 sold, RIAA certified gold
2004	Fall Out Boy	My Heart Will Always Be The B-Side To My Tongue	Fueled By Ramen	Producer, Mixer	
2005	The Juliana Theory	Deadbeat Sweetheartbeat	Abacus Records	Mixer, Engineer	
2005	This Is Me Smiling	This Is Me Smiling	Sony Records	Producer, Mixer, Engineer	
2006	Plain White T's	Every Second Counts	Hollywood Records	Producer, Mixer, Engineer	750,000 sold, RIAA certified gold
2006	Plain White T's	Hey There Delilah	Fearless Records	Co-Producer, Mixer	#1 on US Billboard Radio Charts (Hot AC/Top 40)
2008	Punchline	Just Say Yes	Modern Short Stories	Producer, Mixer, Engineer	
2007	The Autumn Defense	Once Around	Yep Roc	Engineer	
2006	The Hush Sound	Like Vines	Fueled By Ramen	Producer, Mixer, Engineer	
2008	Rachael Yamagata	Elephants...Teeth Sinking Into Heart	Warner Bros. Records	Engineer, Drums	
2009	The Von Bondies	Love, Hate and Then There's You	Majordomo	Engineer	
2009	Company of Thieves	Ordinary Riches	Wind-Up Records	Producer, Mixer, Engineer	
2010	Skybox	Morning After Cuts	Indie	Producer, Mixer, Engineer	
2010	This Is Me Smiling	Only Uphill	Indie	Mixer	
2010	Gold Motel	Gold Motel EP	Indie	Mixer	
2010	Gold Motel	Summer House	Indie	Mixer	
2011	Mark Rose	Wonderful Trouble	Indie	Producer, Mixer, Engineer	
2013	Five Years Further	Perfection is Lifeless	Indie	Producer, Engineer	
2013	Mark Rose	The Sound Of A Turnaround	Indie	Producer, Mixer, Engineer	
2013	The Fold	Moving Past	Indie	Producer, Mixer, Engineer	
2014	From Thin Air	Masquerade	Indie	Producer, Mixer, Engineer	
2014	Real Friends	Maybe This Place Is the Same and We’re Just Changing	Fearless Records	Mixer	
2018	Fall Out Boy	Lake Effect Kid	Island Records and Decaydance	Producer, Mixer, Engineer	
2019	AM Taxi	Shiver by Me		Mixer	
2020	You vs Yesterday	You vs Yesterday	Indie	Producer, Mixer, Engineer	
2021	Beach Bunny	"Cloud 9" featuring Tegan and Sara	Mom + Pop	Mixer	
2022	Beach Bunny	Emotional Creature	Mom + Pop	Producer, Mixer, Engineer	
2024	Beach Bunny	"Vertigo"	Mom + Pop	Producer	
