= Eyes Upon Separation =

American hardcore punk band

- Origin: Ohio
- Genres: Hardcore punk, mathcore, noise rock
- Years active: 1998–2002
- Labels: Uprising, Tribunal
- Past members: Brandon Smith; Matt Auxier; Nick Corns; JT Woodruff; Jeremey Rankin; Jeff Lohrber

Eyes Upon Separation was a hardcore punk band from Ohio that formed in 1998. In 2001, guitarist Matt Auxier briefly played in the metalcore band Zao. Bassist JT Woodruff formed the alternative rock band Hawthorne Heights, Second Drummer, Jeff Lohrber joined hardcore band, Suffocate Faster as well as Today Is the Day, and is currently in Harlots. Other members (who the 'other members' are is still unknown) formed the black metal/metalcore band Surcease.

== Discography ==
EPs

- The Leaves Fall With Grace, The Leaves Fall With Sadness (2000; Tribunal)

Studio albums

- I Hope She's Having Nightmares (2002; Uprising)

== Members ==
Last known line-up

- Brandon Smith - vocals (1998-2002)
- Matt Auxier - guitar (1998-2002)
- Nick Corns - guitar (1998-2002)
- JT Woodruff - bass (1998-2002)
- Jeff Lohrber - drums (2002)

Former

- Jeremey Rankin - drums (1998-2002)
- Eric Wilt - guitar (1998)
- Justin Kellermeier - bass (2000)
- Chris Common - drums (2001)
- Jimi Shestina - bass (2002)

Timeline
