= From Under the Cork Tree =

2005 album by Fall Out Boy

Studio album by Fall Out Boy
- Released: May 3, 2005
- Recorded: November 2004 – March 2005
- Studios: Ocean Studios, Burbank, California
- Genres: Pop-punk; emo
- Length: 43:00
- Label: Island
- Producer: Neal Avron

Fall Out Boy chronology
Take This to Your Grave (2003)	From Under the Cork Tree (2005)	Infinity on High (2007)

Alternative cover
- Limited "Black Clouds and Underdogs" edition

Singles from From Under the Cork Tree
- 1. "Sugar, We're Goin Down" Released: April 4, 2005; 2. "Dance, Dance" Released: October 31, 2005; 3. "A Little Less Sixteen Candles, a Little More "Touch Me"" Released: March 14, 2006

From Under the Cork Tree is the second studio album by the American rock band Fall Out Boy, released on May 3, 2005, by Island Records as the band's major label debut. The music was composed by lead vocalist and guitarist Patrick Stump, with all lyrics penned by bassist Pete Wentz, expanding the band's songwriting approach they took for some songs on their debut album, Take This to Your Grave (2003). Neal Avron served as the album's producer. Commenting on the record's lyrical themes, Wentz said the lyrics were about "the anxiety and depression that goes along with looking at your own life." In support of its release, the group headlined tours worldwide and played at various music festivals. For their Black Clouds and Underdogs tour, the album was re-released as From Under the Cork Tree (Limited "Black Clouds and Underdogs" Edition), featuring new songs and remixes.

The album was Fall Out Boy's breakthrough mainstream success. Spearheaded by the lead single "Sugar, We're Goin Down", the album debuted at No. 9 on the US Billboard 200 with 68,000 first week sales, a position it stayed at for two non-consecutive weeks, earning the band their first Top 10 album and becoming their longest charting and best-selling album. It logged 14 weeks in the Top 20 out of its 78 chart weeks. The album as well as its singles won several awards and the album was certified 5× Platinum by the Recording Industry Association of America (RIAA) for selling 5 million units in the United States. It has since sold over seven million worldwide. The album produced two hugely popular hit singles, "Sugar, We're Goin Down" and "Dance, Dance", which peaked at No. 8 and No. 9 on the Billboard Hot 100 respectively, receiving regular radio play on both pop and alternative stations. In 2005, the album was ranked at No. 43 on the International Federation of the Phonographic Industry's (IFPI) list of the "Top 50 Best Selling Albums of 2005" worldwide.

== Background ==
Fall Out Boy formed near Chicago, Illinois, in 2001. The band debuted with a self-released demo in the same year, and in 2002 released a split EP with Project Rocket through Uprising Records. A first mini-album, Fall Out Boy's Evening Out with Your Girlfriend was recorded in 2002 but released in 2003 by Uprising against the band's wishes. Both releases helped Fall Out Boy gain notoriety on the internet and attention from record labels. The band signed with indie label Fueled by Ramen and received an advance from major label Island Records, which financed the production of Take This to Your Grave. Grave became an underground success and helped the band gain a dedicated fanbase. Fall Out Boy returned to the studio in November 2004 to begin work on a new album.

However, the group suffered a setback in February 2005 after Wentz's anxieties about creating a new record culminated in a suicide attempt. Wentz explained, "It was overwhelming. I was either totally anxious or totally depressed. It is particularly overwhelming when you are on the cusp of doing something very big and thinking that it will be a big flop. I was racked with self-doubt." After undergoing therapy, Wentz rejoined the band and headed to Burbank, California to record the album.

== Recording and production ==
From Under the Cork Tree was recorded at Ocean Studios in Burbank, California from November 2004 to March 2005, and served as the first time the band had stayed in California for an extended period of time. The group lived in corporate housing during the making of the album. In contrast to Take This to Your Grave's rushed recording schedule, Fall Out Boy took a much more gradual pace while working on From Under the Cork Tree. It was the first Fall Out Boy record in which Stump created all the music and Wentz wrote all the lyrics, continuing the approach they took for some songs on Grave. Stump felt that this process was much more "smooth" as every member was able to focus on his individual strengths. He explained: "We haven't had any of those moments when I play the music and he'll say, 'I don't like that,' and he'll read me lyrics and I'll say, 'I don't like those lyrics.' It's very natural and fun." Despite this, the band had great difficulty creating its desired sound for the album, constantly scrapping new material. Two weeks before recording sessions began, the group abandoned ten songs and wrote eight more, including the album's first single, "Sugar, We're Goin Down".

The chorus of "Sugar, We're Goin Down" was nearly thrown away by the group's label, Island Records, but it was ultimately salvaged. Wentz recalled, "Our label told us the chorus was too wordy and the guitars were too heavy and that the radio wasn't going to play it." Island Records also intervened when the band wanted to title the album's first track "My Name Is David Ruffin And These Are The Temptations". Wentz stated "Our label said, 'You're going to get sued for doing that,' and our lawyer said, 'You're definitely going to get sued for doing that,' which totally sucked. So we said, 'OK, why don't we immortalize you in a song?'" The group subsequently retitled the song "Our Lawyer Made Us Change the Name of This Song So We Wouldn't Get Sued".

== Composition ==
=== Music ===
Stump served as the primary composer for From Under the Cork Tree. He said of the album's musical style: "We experimented quite a bit with all sorts of stuff. Some metal, some folk, some R&B. But ultimately, your band sounds like your band. You can put those things in it, but it's still going to sound like you." Niyaz Pirani of the Orange County Register referred to "Dance, Dance" as "pop-punk-meets-swing-dance glory". Critics have described the album as being pop-punk and emo. Additionally, Alternative Press categorized the album as "scene music".

=== Lyrics ===
On earlier works, Stump collaborated with Wentz on the lyrics. For From Under the Cork Tree and albums thereafter, Wentz handled all the lyrical duties. He called them "more introspective" than the group's previous album. "Take This To Your Grave was very reactionary," Wentz said. "It was like this person does this to you. But part of growing up is understanding that if you end up in the same situation over and over again you probably have to examine your own self and wonder whether that's one of the reasons that you have ended up in the same situation repeatedly. This time the lyrics were more about the anxiety and depression that goes along with looking at your own life." He also said of his lyrics, "This is where we're going to be a year from now, and this is what you're going to be saying about us." Wentz described "I've Got a Dark Alley and a Bad Idea that Says You Should Shut Your Mouth (Summer Song)" as "looking in the mirror and not feeling safe in your own skin".

The band wanted to create a record that was "a lot more developed," Wentz said. "When we did Take This to Your Grave, we were really young, we had two weeks to do it and it was like, make it or break it, this is your only shot. This time we had more time to sit with the songs and make them work and more of a chance to plan things out. To us, we're throwing the fight, but we didn't write a record that's throwing a fight. We wrote a record that means a lot to us but maybe isn't going to mean a lot to the people who are hyping us as the next big thing. And that's fine. We don't want to be the saviors of anything — we just want to be ourselves. We made a record we really like, and that's all we ever wanted. Fall Out Boy have never been about goals or ambitions. We started out just for fun, and it became this huge thing." In 2007, it emerged that the band had reached an out of court settlement with American Nightmare vocalist Wesley Eisold, over the use of his poetry in some songs from From Under the Cork Tree and Infinity on High. The settlement led to future pressings of both albums listing Eisold in the credits.

== Title and artwork ==
The title is taken from a line in the 1936 children's book The Story of Ferdinand by Munro Leaf, which Wentz was intrigued by. The story focuses on a bull named Ferdinand who would rather sniff flowers under a cork tree than participate in fights.

== Critical reception ==
Professional ratings
Review scores
Source	Rating
AllMusic	4.5/5 stars
Alternative Press	4.5/5 stars
The Boston Phoenix	3/4 stars
Entertainment Weekly	B+
IGN	3.6/10
Rolling Stone	3/5 stars
The Rolling Stone Album Guide	3.5/5 stars
USA Today	3/4 stars
The Village Voice	C+

Critical reaction to From Under the Cork Tree was generally positive. In an extremely positive review of the album, Johnny Loftus of AllMusic said: "Musically, Cork Tree's first five tracks are relentless, with razor-sharp melodies that seem familiar but sound totally unique at the same time. The 'Oh! Oh!'s and punchy chords of 'Of All the Gin Joints in All the World' are a thrill greater than any Jimmy Eat World album ever; 'Sugar, We're Going Down' 's half-time shifts are triumphs of tumbling words; and the opening track meditates wryly on all-ages shows' fame. Further, when Fall Out Boy rip into 'Sophomore Slump or Comeback of the Year,' summer 2005 will not be able to ignore them. 'We're the therapists pumping through your speakers/Delivering just what you need,' they sing. It's obviously time to embrace our inner mall kid." Entertainment Weekly gave the album a B+ in one of its "short takes" and called it "Peppy pop-punk aimed at the Warped Tour crowd. If the infectious songs don't get you, the snarky titles will".

However, mixed criticism was dealt by reviewers for the band being part of a saturated scene of pop-punk bands. In Rolling Stone's review, they gave it 3 stars out of 5 saying "...FOB's knack for crafting ginormous, soaring anthems is in full-force: even with its demented, inscrutable lyrics, "Sugar, We're Goin Down" will likely still be blasting from radios ten years on." Music critic Robert Christgau, in a C+ review of the album, said that "these Warped Tour cover boys aren't terrible, but are they ever ordinary. Only their record company would claim that emotional vocals, dramatic dynamics, poppy-punky tempos, and not actually all that catchy tunes add up to their own sound." IGN was very negative towards the album, giving it a 3.6 out of 10 saying: "Pop-punk had to begin somewhere, and when it rains, it apparently pours; Fall Out Boy is merely another addition to a stable bursting at the seams."

=== Accolades ===
Rolling Stone listed it among the "40 Greatest Emo Albums of All Time" in 2016, with Brittany Spanos writing it "changed the course of emo-punk, pop-punk and pop itself with From Under the Cork Tree, which brought the scene mainstream."

Accolades for From Under the Cork Tree
Year	Publication	Country	Rank	List
2012	Rock Sound	U.K.	7	101 Modern Classics
2014	Rock Sound	U.K.	14	The 51 Most Essential Pop Punk Albums of All Time
2016	Rolling Stone	U.S.	9	40 Greatest Emo Albums of All Time

== Commercial performance ==
From Under the Cork Tree debuted at No. 9 on the US Billboard 200 with 68,000 copies sold in its first week. It became the band's first top 10 effort, as their 2003 album Take This to Your Grave did not chart in the top 200. Logging 78 weeks on the chart, Cork Tree has sold over 5 million copies in the US and over seven million worldwide, making it Fall Out Boy's best selling album. It is certified RIAA 5× platinum for shipments of five million copies. During Christmas 2005, the album again reached its peak of No. 9 with 257,000 sales, posting the band's second biggest sales week to date as of 2013. Upon the release of Fall Out Boy's 2007 follow-up album Infinity on High, which debuted at No. 1 on the Billboard 200, From Under the Cork Tree re-entered the Billboard 200 at No. 168 with 5,300 sales. In early 2015, the album re-entered the Billboard 200 at No. 190 for a 78th week on the strength of the band's American Beauty/American Psycho No. 1 album release.

On the 2005 year-end charts, Cork Tree was No. 53 on the Billboard 200, No. 26 in 2006, and No. 187 on the 2000s decade-end chart.

=== Singles ===
Three singles were released from this album: "Sugar, We're Goin Down", "Dance, Dance" and "A Little Less Sixteen Candles, a Little More "Touch Me"". The first two singles enjoyed mainstream and commercial success and exposed Fall Out Boy to a new audience. From Under the Cork Tree's lead single, "Sugar, We're Goin Down", debuted on the US Billboard Hot 100 at No. 93 and eleven weeks later it peaked at No. 8 in September 2005. It spent five weeks in the top 10 and 20 weeks (five months) in the top 20, logging a total of 42 weeks on the chart before it was retired. The track received heavy airplay spins on Alternative as well as Pop stations, being a crossover hit. It reached No. 3 on Billboard Alternative Songs. Its MTV2-award-winning video enjoyed regular rotation on TV music programs. This exposed the band to the mainstream audience and helped them reach great popularity. In the UK, "Sugar" also reached No. 8, and spent 21 weeks in the top 75. "Sugar, We're Goin Down" has sold over two million copies in the US and was certified Diamond by the Recording Industry Association of America (RIAA), denoting the shipment of ten million copies. It stands as the band's best-selling single to date.

The second single from the album, "Dance, Dance" was also released to commercial success, charting at No. 9 in the US in January 2006 and No. 8 in the UK, a second top 10 hit single for the band in both regions. In the US it spent 14 weeks in the top 20 out of a total of 30 chart weeks before it was retired, being certified 7× Platinum by the RIAA for the shipment of seven million units. "Dance, Dance" is Fall Out Boy's highest hit on Alternative radio, peaking at No. 2 on Billboard Alternative Songs. It charted at No. 35 on Ireland's singles chart. "Dance, Dance"'s music video won awards for "Viewer's Choice" and "Best Group" at the 2006 MTV awards, two Teen Choice Awards for "Rock Track" and "Single", and helped the band win "People's Choice: Favorite International Group" at the MuchMusic Video Awards.

"A Little Less Sixteen Candles, a Little More "Touch Me"", the album's third and last single, was much less popular than Cork Tree's first two singles but managed to reach No. 65 on the Hot 100. It charted for 13 weeks. On Billboard Alternative Songs, it peaked at No. 38. In the UK, "Sixteen Candles" reached No. 38 on the singles chart. The band considered between "A Little Less Sixteen Candles..." and "Sophomore Slump or Comeback of the Year" as the third and last single, deciding on the former.

== Track listing ==
All lyrics are written by Pete Wentz; all music is composed by Fall Out Boy.

No.	Title	Length
1.	"Our Lawyer Made Us Change the Name of This Song So We Wouldn't Get Sued"	3:09
2.	"Of All the Gin Joints in All the World"	3:11
3.	"Dance, Dance"	3:00
4.	"Sugar, We're Goin Down"	3:49
5.	"Nobody Puts Baby in the Corner"	3:21
6.	"I've Got a Dark Alley and a Bad Idea That Says You Should Shut Your Mouth (Summer Song)"	3:11
7.	"7 Minutes in Heaven (Atavan Halen)"	3:02
8.	"Sophomore Slump or Comeback of the Year"	3:23
9.	"Champagne for My Real Friends, Real Pain for My Sham Friends"	3:23
10.	"I Slept with Someone in Fall Out Boy and All I Got Was This Stupid Song Written About Me"	3:31
11.	"A Little Less Sixteen Candles, a Little More "Touch Me""	2:49
12.	"Get Busy Living or Get Busy Dying (Do Your Part to Save the Scene and Stop Going to Shows)"	3:27
13.	"XO"	3:40
Total length:		43:00

Limited "Black Clouds and Underdogs" edition

On March 14, 2006, a separate version of the album was released entitled From Under the Cork Tree (Limited "Black Clouds and Underdogs" edition). This consisted of a total 18 tracks, the first 13 being the original release. The album rose to No. 9 on the Billboard 200 upon its re-release, its second week at its peak position. The three new songs and two dance remixes are as follows and in this order:^{[note 1]}^{[note 2]}

No.	Title	Length
14.	"Snitches and Talkers Get Stitches and Walkers"	2:50
15.	"The Music or the Misery"	3:28
16.	"My Heart Is the Worst Kind of Weapon" (Demo)	3:22
17.	"Sugar, We're Goin Down" (Patrick Stump Remix)	4:00
18.	"Dance, Dance" (Lindbergh Palace Remix)	3:28
Total length:		60:08

20th Anniversary Deluxe Edition bonus tracks ^{[note 3]}
No.	Title	Writer(s)	Length
14.	"Sugar, We’re Goin Down (Live on BBC Radio)"		3:46
15.	"Where’s Your Boy (Live on BBC Radio)"		3:18
16.	"Of All the Gin Joints in All the World (Live on BBC Radio)"		3:12
17.	"Dance, Dance (Live on BBC Radio)"		3:01
18.	"Sugar, We’re Goin Down (Acoustic)"		3:50
19.	"Nobody Puts Baby in a Corner (Acoustic)"		3:21
20.	"Start Today" (Gorilla Biscuits cover)	Anthony Civarelli, Walter Schreifels	2:04
21.	"I Slept With Someone in Fall Out Boy and All I Got Was This Stupid Song Written About Me (Alternate Version)"		3:33
22.	"Sophomore Slump or Comeback of the Year (Alternate Version)"		3:25
23.	"Dance, Dance (RJDZ Remix)"		3:58
24.	"Sugar, We’re Goin Down (TLA Radio Edit)"		3:47
25.	"Dance, Dance (Tommie Sunshine Fire N Brimstone Remix)"		6:12
26.	"Sugar, We’re Goin Down (Instrumental)"		3:49
27.	"Snitches and Talkers Get Stitches and Walkers"		2:50
28.	"The Music or the Misery"		3:28
29.	"My Heart Is the Worst Kind of Weapon (Demo)"		2:53
30.	"Sugar, We're Goin Down (Patrick Stump Remix)"		3:59
31.	"Dance, Dance (The Lindbergh Palace Remix)"		3:28
Total length:			97:00

=== Notes ===
^{1} The iTunes Store released a similar From Under the Cork Tree (Limited "Black Clouds and Underdogs" Edition) EP consisting of 8 tracks: the above 5 as well as the music videos for "Sugar We're Goin Down" and "Dance, Dance". It also contains a live performance of "Sugar, We're Goin Down".
^{2} The limited edition is sometimes sold along with the regular edition under the same name.
^{3} Tracks 27-31 omitted from physical copies of the 20th anniversary edition.

== Personnel ==
All credits for From Under the Cork Tree are adapted from the album's liner notes, except where noted.

Fall Out Boy

- Patrick Stump – vocals, guitar, piano on "Sugar, We're Goin Down"
- Pete Wentz – bass, backing vocals, unclean vocals (1, 8, 10, 12–14)
- Joe Trohman – guitar, backing vocals
- Andy Hurley – drums, percussion

Guest musicians

- William Beckett (of The Academy Is...) – additional vocals on "Sophomore Slump or Comeback of the Year"
- Brendon Urie (of Panic! at the Disco) – additional vocals on "7 Minutes in Heaven (Atavan Halen)"
- Chad Gilbert (of New Found Glory) – additional vocals on "I Slept With Someone in Fall Out Boy and All I Got Was This Stupid Song Written about Me"

Production

- Neal Avron – producer, mixing (1, 5, 6, 7, 9, 10, 12, 13)
- Tom Lord-Alge – mixing (2–4, 8, 11)
- Matt Green – mixing assistant (1, 5, 6, 7, 9, 10, 12, 13)
- George Combs – mixing assistant (1, 5, 6, 7, 9, 10, 12, 13)
- Femio Hernandez – mixing assistant (2–4, 8, 11)
- Brian "Big Bass" Gardner – mastering
- Travis Huff – Pro Tools engineer
- Louis Marino – creative direction
- Frank Gargiulo – art direction and album design

== Charts ==
=== Weekly charts ===
Weekly chart performance for From Under the Cork Tree
Chart (2005–2006)	Peak position
Belgian Albums (Ultratop Flanders)	99
Canadian Albums (Billboard)	7
French Albums (SNEP)	131
Irish Albums (IRMA)	32
New Zealand Albums (RMNZ)	9
Scottish Albums (Official Charts)	12
UK Albums (Official Charts)	12
US Billboard 200	9
US Top Rock Albums (Billboard)	2

Chart (2025)	Peak position
Greek Albums (IFPI)	81

=== Year-end charts ===
2005 year-end chart performance for From Under the Cork Tree
Chart (2005)	Position
US Billboard 200	53
Worldwide Albums (IFPI)	43

2006 year-end chart performance for From Under the Cork Tree
Chart (2006)	Position
UK Albums (OCC)	80
US Billboard 200	26
US Top Rock Albums (Billboard)	13

=== Decade-end charts ===
Decade-end chart performance for From Under the Cork Tree
Chart (2000–2009)	Position
US Billboard 200	187

== Certifications ==
Certifications for From Under the Cork Tree
Region	Certification	Certified units/sales
Canada (Music Canada)	2× Platinum	200,000^{^}
New Zealand (RMNZ)	Platinum	15,000^{‡}
United Kingdom (BPI)	Platinum	300,000^{^}
United States (RIAA)	5× Platinum	5,000,000^{‡}
^{^} Shipments figures based on certification alone.^{‡} Sales+streaming figures based on certification alone.
