= Stop Doing Bad Things =

Studio album by Spitalfield
- Released: March 22, 2005
- Recorded: December 2004
- Studio: Blacklodge Studios, Eudora, Kansas
- Genre: Alternative rock
- Label: Victory
- Producer: Ed Rose and Spitalfield

Spitalfield chronology
Remember Right Now (2003)	Stop Doing Bad Things (2005)	Better than Knowing Where You Are (2006)

Professional ratings
Review scores
Source	Rating
Allmusic	3.5/5 stars

Stop Doing Bad Things is the third full-length release from American band, Spitalfield, released on March 22, 2005, through Victory.

== Track listing ==
- All songs by Spitalfield
1. "So I Heard You Joined A Convent" – 3:01
2. "Texa$ With A Dollar Sign" – 3:51
3. "Gold Dust Vs. State Of Illinois" – 4:08
4. "What Were You Thinking?" – 3:32
5. "Tampa Bum Blues" – 2:48
6. "Restraining Order Blues" – 4:03
7. "The Future Is Now" – 3:21
8. "Van Buren" – 2:46
9. "From The Desk Of B. Larsen" – 3:54
10. "Building A Better City By Design" – 2:58
11. "Simple Minds, Simple Lives" – 3:29

== Notes ==
- Some prints of the album have 12 tracks, but tracks 3 and 4 are both "Gold Dust Vs. State Of Illinois." This was a pressing error by Victory Records, but it was played off by a contest in which the first two hundred people to submit "the final bad thing" won a prize.
- The song title "Texa$ With A Dollar Sign" is derived from a famous SNL "Celebrity Jeopardy" skit where Jimmy Fallon, as French Stewart, wagers "Texa$" in Final Jeopardy.

== Personnel ==
Adapted from discogs

Spitalfield

- Daniel Lowder - guitar
- T.J. Minich - bass guitar
- Mark Rose - vocals, guitar
- J.D. Romero - drums

Production

- Ed Rose - production
- Michael Fossenkemper - mixing
- Paul Friemel - album layout, album artwork, band photography
- Craig Aichele - band photography
