= Company of Thieves (band) =

American rock band

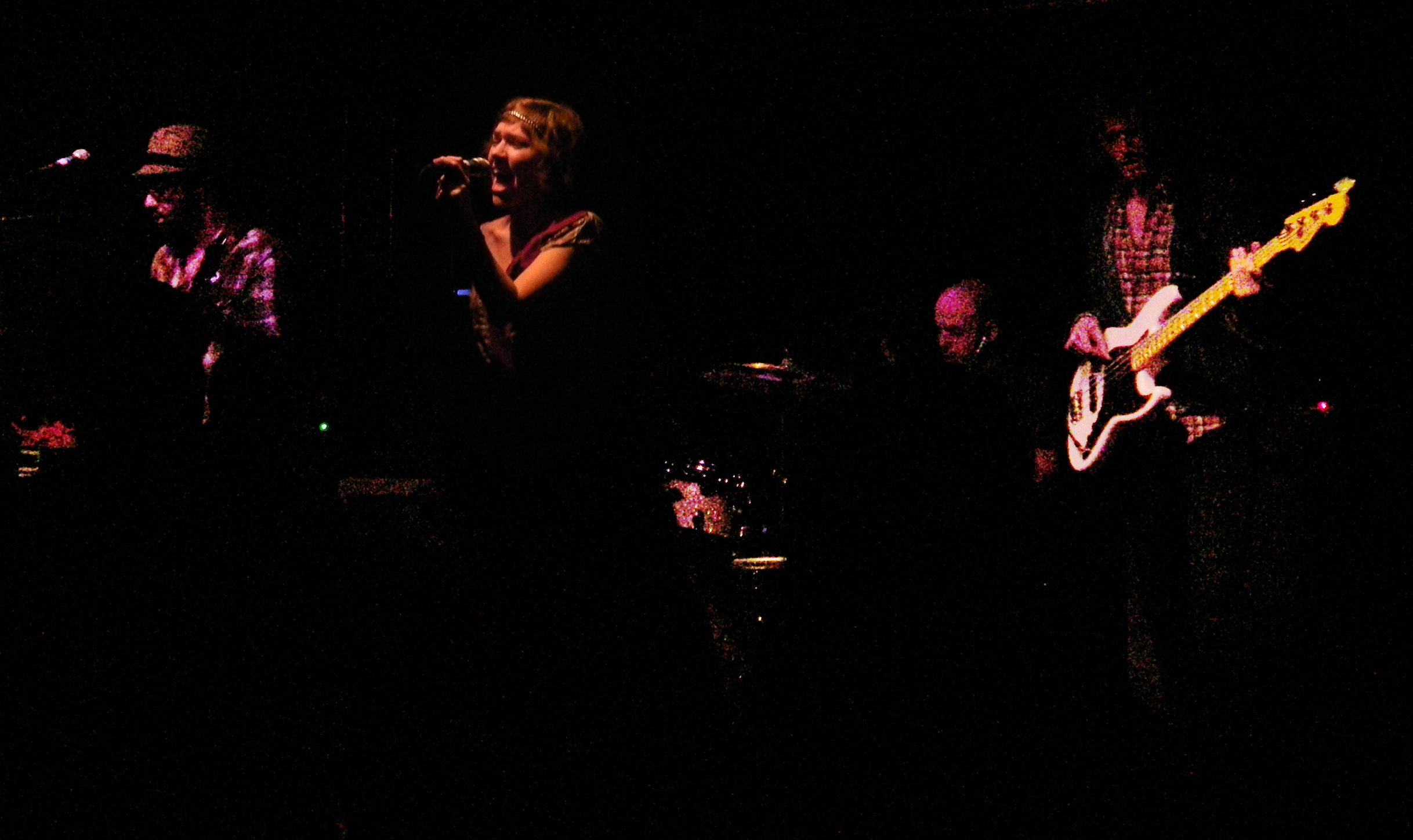
- Company of Thieves performing in 2009 with former bassist Bob Buckstaff

Background information
- Origin: Chicago, Illinois, United States
- Genres: Indie rock, alternative rock
- Years active: 2007–2014; 2017–2018
- Label: Wind-up Records
- Members: Genevieve Schatz; Marc Walloch; Chris Faller

Company of Thieves were an American indie rock band from Chicago, Illinois, founded by Genevieve Schatz (vocals) and Marc Walloch (guitar). Their first album, Ordinary Riches, was released independently in 2007 and re-released in 2009. Their second album, Running from a Gamble, was released in 2011. The band announced they had no plans to record any new music as of January 2014, but announced a reunion in May 2017.

== History ==
They have been featured as an iTunes Discovery Download for their song "Oscar Wilde", as well as in their Indie Spotlight: Rock/Alternative – featuring the album alongside the recommended track, "Pressure". They also won the 2007 New York Songwriters Circle contest for "Oscar Wilde".

The band's debut album, Ordinary Riches, was released independently on May 29, 2007 and debuted on Billboard's Heatseekers Chart at No. 5. After signing with Wind-up Records the album was digitally re-released on January 6, 2009. A CD release was made available on February 24, 2009.

In January 2009, Genevieve and Marc appeared on "Live from Daryl's House", Daryl Hall's monthly Internet concert, as Company of Thieves. They performed "Pressure", "Even in the Dark", "Past the Sleep" and "Around the Block" from their debut album, along with Hall & Oates songs "Starting All Over Again" and "Everytime You Go Away", as well as other covers. They also performed on Last Call with Carson Daly in February.

Company of Thieves' single "Oscar Wilde" was featured on "Gossip Girl: Real NY Stories Revealed" as part of the Dove Go Fresh campaign, as well as being aired during an episode of Gossip Girl.

Their second album, Running from a Gamble, was released on May 17, 2011. The lead single, "Death of Communication", was released on March 15, 2011.

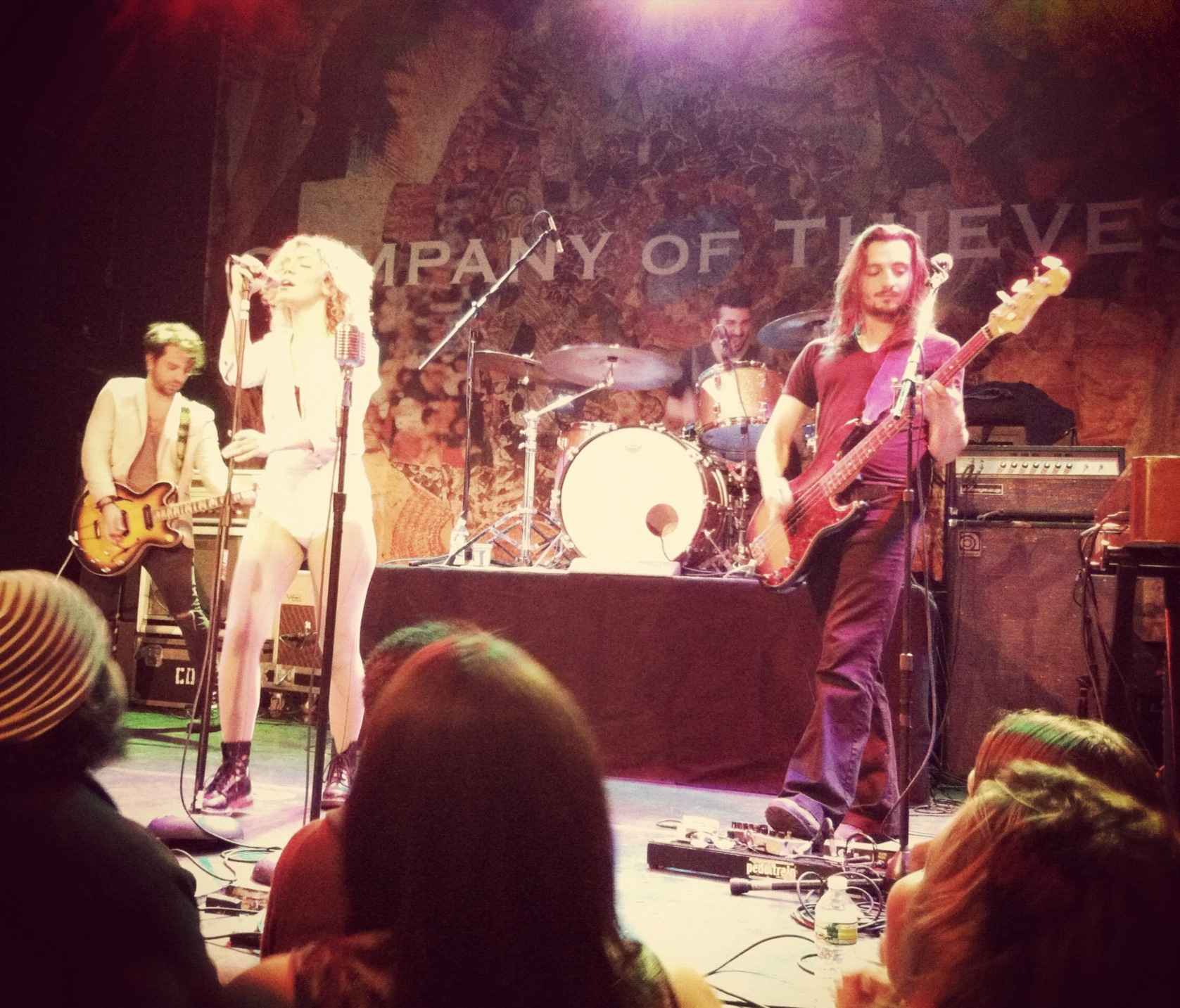
Company of Thieves performing at the Bowery Ballroom in New York City

The band went through several line-up changes during its history. They began as a trio with founding members Genevieve Schatz and Marc Walloch alongside drummer Mike Ortiz. In 2011 Ortiz posted a formal letter to his fans on the official website of Company of Thieves stating his decision to depart from the band. Chris Faller (former bassist of The Hush Sound) was used as bassist on Company of Thieves' last album, "Running from a Gamble". Faller played drums for the band's live performances after Mike Ortiz left along with bassist Marcin Sulewski. On their 2012 tour, Company of Thieves appeared with Chris Faller as bassist on stage along with a new drummer, Matt Rullo. Eitan Bernstein did not play keyboards on the second album, but toured with the band as the official keyboardist.

On January 9, 2014, an official email was sent by Genevieve confirming that there were no plans to record any further Company of Thieves albums.

On May 21, 2017, Company of Thieves updated their Facebook page with a new band photo of Schatz, Walloch, Faller, and another photo with "Company of Thieves Fall 2017" confirming a reunion. A reunion tour in September 2017 was announced in July, as well as a forthcoming single.

On July 28, 2017, a new single entitled "Treasure" was made available for download. An 11-city tour ran from Tuesday, September 12 in Indianapolis, Indiana, to September 30 in Los Angeles. Walloch stated in an interview with axs.com that the band intended to work on writing music for new singles/an EP after the reunion tour finished and future tours would follow.

== Members ==
=== Current ===
- Genevieve Schatz – vocals
- Marc Walloch – guitar
- Chris Faller – bass, drums, keyboards

=== Touring ===
- Mike Maimone – keyboards
- Brendan McCusker – drums

=== Former ===
- Dorian Duffy – bass
- Mike Ortiz – drums
- Scott Heatherly – keyboards
- Jimmy Ratke – drums
- Brad Sawicki – bass
- Mike Maimone – keyboards
- Bob Buckstaff – bass
- Marcin Sulewski – bass
- Eitan Bernstein – keyboards
- Matt Rullo – drums

== Discography ==
=== Studio albums ===
Title	Details	Peak chart positions			
Title	Details	US	US Alt	US Heat	US Rock
Ordinary Riches	Release date: February 24, 2009 (Originally released independently in 2007); Label: Wind-up Records; Formats: CD, music download	162	—	5	—
Running from a Gamble	Released: May 17, 2011; Label: Wind-up Records; Formats: CD, music download	97	12	—	25
"—" denotes releases that did not chart

=== Singles ===
Year	Single	Album
2009	"Oscar Wilde"	Ordinary Riches
2009	"Pressure"	Ordinary Riches
2011	"Death of Communication"	Running from a Gamble
2011	"Tallulah"	Running from a Gamble
2017	"Treasure"	Treasure

=== EPs ===
The Acoustic EP (2007)

== Awards ==
Independent Music Awards 2012: Running from a Gamble – Best Indie/Alt. Album
