= Sugar, We're Goin Down =

2005 single by Fall Out Boy

Single by Fall Out Boy

from the album From Under the Cork Tree
- B-side: "The Music or the Misery"
- Released: April 4, 2005
- Studio: Ocean (Burbank, California)
- Genre: Pop-punk; emo
- Length: 3:49
- Label: Island; Mercury
- Composers: Pete Wentz; Patrick Stump; Joe Trohman; Andy Hurley
- Lyricist: Pete Wentz
- Producer: Neal Avron

Fall Out Boy singles chronology
| "Saturday" (2003) | "Sugar, We're Goin Down" (2005) | "Dance, Dance" (2005) |

Music video
- "Sugar, We're Goin Down" on YouTube "Sugar, We're Goin Down (Lo Fi Cut Version) on YouTube

"Sugar, We're Goin Down"
Song sample taken from the album From Under the Cork Tree. It was the band's breakthrough single.

"Sugar, We're Goin Down" is a song by American rock band Fall Out Boy, released to US radio on April 4, 2005, as the lead single from their second album, From Under the Cork Tree. Two different CD singles were released with different B-sides, Part I with a green cover and Part II with a red cover. With music composed by vocalist Patrick Stump and lyrics penned by bassist Pete Wentz, the single reached No. 8 on the US Billboard Hot 100, becoming Fall Out Boy's first top-10 hit and exploding the band into the mainstream, exposing them to a new audience. It spent five weeks in the top 10 and 20 weeks in the top 20 out of its 42 chart weeks.

The song became the band's first two-million seller in July 2009, and as of February 2013, has sold 4,639,000 copies in the US. It was upgraded to a Diamond certification by the Recording Industry Association of America (RIAA) in November 2026. On October 13, 2023, "Sugar, We're Goin Down" was certified 2× Platinum by the British Phonographic Industry (BPI) for 1,200,000 sales.

Village Voice Media described the track as representing the "Myspace emo" style.

== Background ==
"Sugar We're Going Down"'s lyrics have been called "almost nonsensical." Patrick Stump told Rolling Stone that he deliberately slurred the lyrics in the song's chorus to make it sound better, saying that he "was trying to do a straight punk song for fun" and adding, "I saw those lyrics and just kind of barked them out. But there was something about the rhythm of it, where I was like, 'Hmm, that actually might be too good for just a shitty punk song.'" Contrary to popular belief, instead of going through thirty versions before going back to the first one, Stump clarified the song went through countless rewrites until they landed on the final version which was chosen.

The song appears in the karaoke games Lips (as downloadable content) and in Karaoke Revolution Presents: American Idol, and is also a playable song on Band Hero. It is in the 2005 film The Fog and its soundtrack. American country pop artist Taylor Swift covered "Sugar, We're Goin Down" at a concert on her 2011 Speak Now Tour in Chicago, during which she would sing a cover of a song originally released by an artist from each tour stop. Hayley Williams joined Fall Out Boy onstage in 2014 to perform the song as part of a Super Bowl Blitz show. The band themselves used a sample of the song in "What a Catch, Donnie" from their 2008 album Folie à Deux and referenced it in "Save Rock and Roll", from their 2013 album of the same title.

== Chart performance ==
"Sugar, We're Goin Down" would rise and fall in inconsistent patterns. The song debuted on the Billboard Hot 100 on July 2, 2005, at No. 93 and rose each week. Eleven weeks later, on September 17, 2005, the song entered the top 10 at its peak of No. 8, becoming Fall Out Boy's first top 10 single. At this point, the song did not have much airplay but had relied on the strength of digital downloads alone, and it experienced a sales surge following the band's performance at the 2005 MTV Video Music Awards.

Following this download surge, however, downloads fell, and the song dropped to No. 15 the following week. During this time, though, mainstream radio support came in, and while downloads were falling, airplay was able to help stabilize the song. As a result, "Sugar" rose in the following weeks to be at either position No. 10 or 11. It spent five weeks in the top 10 and 20 weeks in the top 20, and in total stayed on the charts for 42 weeks before it was retired, making it the band's most successful single charting. The track peaked at No. 2 on the Hot Digital Songs chart and reached the top position on the Hot Digital Tracks chart. Its airplay peak was No. 18 on the Hot 100 Airplay chart. Through 2005, it sold 830,835 digital copies in the US.

On the Pop 100 chart, "Sugar, We're Goin Down" displayed a slightly better performance. With the same digital download stats, but with an airplay panel to its advantage, the song reached a peak position of No. 6 on the Pop 100 with its component airplay, Pop 100 Airplay, being No. 6. In terms of total spins versus total impressions, the single also peaked at No. 6 on the Top 40 Mainstream chart. It reached No. 3 on the Hot Modern Rock Tracks chart and became a rock-radio staple.

In the United Kingdom, the song first charted on January 15, 2006, at No. 54 before moving to just outside the top 20 at No. 24 on February 5. However, it continued rising in the charts in February, and entered the top 10 at its peak position of No. 8. As of 2013, the song has sold over 200,000 copies in the UK to date being certified silver. It remained in the top 75 of the UK Singles Chart for 21 weeks.

== Music video ==
The official music video for "Sugar, We're Goin Down" was directed by Matt Lenski, and has been described as "bizarre." The music video centers on a boy who has deer antlers on his head (played by Donald Cumming). While he is walking around, a younger boy throws a shirt at one of his antlers and gives him the middle finger. While he is sitting at a cemetery and eating, a kite falls onto his antlers and a girl tries to recover it, and they become friends. The girl's father disapproves because the boy has antlers, asking him to leave his daughter alone. Frustrated, the boy decides to try to cut off his antlers with a variety of tools, but she stops him. Later, the couple goes to a bowling alley. When the girl's father sees they are still together, he tries to shoot the boy with a bow and arrow, but fails as a car rams into him. The boy tries to help him and notices that he has deer hooves for feet. The father then gives the couple his blessing. The music video also frequently cuts to scenes of the band members performing the song.

== Reception and legacy ==
Blender ranked "Sugar, We're Goin Down" at No. 4 on their "100 Greatest Songs of 2005" list and About.com placed the song at No. 3 on their "Top 100 Pop Songs of 2005" list. It was also nominated for the Kerrang! Award for Best Single in 2006. In 2009, Phoenix New Times writer Martin Cizmar wrote that "Sugar, We're Goin Down" was possibly "the most listened-to emo track of all time".

Music critics have retrospectively considered "Sugar, We're Goin' Down" as a seminal, genre-shaping song within pop punk and emo. In 2015, Billboard ranked the song number six on their list of the 10 greatest Fall Out Boy songs. In 2020, Alternative Press called "Sugar, We're Goin' Down" one of the most influential pop punk songs of all time, stating that the song "shaped the genre", was "a lyrically abstract masterpiece that gave subsequent bands an excuse to write creatively" and that it was "a game-changer". In 2021, Kerrang ranked the song number four on their list of the 20 greatest Fall Out Boy songs. Also in 2021, Rolling Stone ranked "Sugar, We're Goin Down" at 443 on their amended list of the "500 Greatest Songs of All Time", noting that the song "signaled a sea change – emo, which had roots in confessional hardcore punk, had grown into a new and often highly theatrical kind of arena rock". Variety ranked it as one of the 25 best emo songs of all time in 2022. In 2026, Taylor Swift said the song helped inspire her songwriting.

== Track listings ==
All songs were written by Fall Out Boy.

CD single

1. "Sugar, We're Goin Down" – 3:51
2. "The Music or the Misery" – 3:27

CD 1

1. "Sugar, We're Goin Down" – 3:47
2. "The Music or the Misery" – 3:27

CD 2

1. "Sugar, We're Goin Down" (album version)
2. "Dance, Dance" (Patrick Stump Secret Agent Remix)
3. "Snitches and Talkers Get Stitches and Walkers"
4. "Sugar, We're Goin Down" (video)

7-inch vinyl

1. "Sugar, We're Goin Down"
2. "Nobody Puts Baby in the Corner" (Acoustic version)

== Personnel ==
Personnel taken from Song Exploder.

- Patrick Stump – vocals, guitar, piano
- Joe Trohman – guitar
- Pete Wentz – bass guitar
- Andy Hurley – drums

== Charts ==
=== Weekly charts ===
| Chart (2005–2006) | Peak position |
|---|---|
| Canada CHR/Pop Top 30 (Radio & Records) | 10 |
| Canada Rock Top 30 (Radio & Records) | 12 |
| European Hot 100 Singles (Billboard) | 36 |
| Ireland (IRMA) | 33 |
| Netherlands (Single Top 100) | 99 |
| Scottish Singles Sales (Official Charts) | 9 |
| UK Singles (Official Charts) | 8 |
| UK Airplay (Music Week) | 26 |
| US Billboard Hot 100 | 8 |
| US Alternative Airplay (Billboard) | 3 |
| US Adult Pop Airplay (Billboard) | 10 |
| US Mainstream Rock Airplay (Billboard) | 36 |
| US Pop Airplay (Billboard) | 6 |
| US Pop 100 (Billboard) | 6 |
| US Rock Digital Songs (Billboard) | 10 |

=== Year-end charts ===
| Chart (2005) | Position |
|---|---|
| US Billboard Hot 100 | 40 |
| US Modern Rock Tracks (Billboard) | 17 |
| US Pop 100 (Billboard) | 31 |

| Chart (2006) | Position |
|---|---|
| UK Singles (OCC) | 92 |
| US Billboard Hot 100 | 68 |
| US Adult Top 40 (Billboard) | 30 |
| US Pop 100 (Billboard) | 47 |

== Certifications ==
Certifications for "Sugar, We're Goin Down"
| Region | Certification | Certified units/sales |
|---|---|---|
| Canada (Music Canada) | Gold | 40,000^{*} |
| New Zealand (RMNZ) | 3× Platinum | 90,000^{‡} |
| United Kingdom (BPI) | 2× Platinum | 1,200,000^{‡} |
| United States (RIAA) | Diamond | 10,000,000^{‡} |
| United States (RIAA) Mastertone | Gold | 500,000^{*} |
^{*} Sales figures based on certification alone.^{‡} Sales+streaming figures based on certification alone.

== Release history ==
| Region | Date | Format | Label | Ref(s). |
|---|---|---|---|---|
| United States | April 4, 2005 | Alternative radio | Island | |
| United Kingdom | February 6, 2006 | CD | Mercury | |
