= Spitalfield =

Rock band from Chicago, USA

- Origin: Chicago, Illinois, U.S.
- Genres: Pop punk; alternative rock; emo
- Years active: 1998–2007; 2010; 2012; 2013; 2015; 2018; 2022–present
- Labels: Victory Records; Sinister Label
- Members: Mark Rose; TJ Minich; Daniel Lowder; Drew Brown
- Past members: J.D. Romero; T.J. Milici; Terry Hahin; Blake Croson; Scott Morrow

Spitalfield is an American rock band from Chicago signed to Victory Records.

Formed in 1998, Spitalfield caught the attention of Victory Records with their 2002 release The Cloak And Dagger Club EP and a year later released their follow-up, Remember Right Now. The band sold over 130,000 records and performed in nine countries over three continents before disbanding at the end of 2007. The band has reformed for shows numerous times, and released their first new single since they disbanded, "Remembering Right Now", on January 17, 2025. They released an EP, Play + Record, on May 30, 2025.

The band derived their name from Spitalfields, a section of London's East End where Jack the Ripper operated. Spitalfield announced their breakup and a goodbye tour on September 10, 2007. Since their original breakup, lead vocalist Mark Rose has pursued a solo singer–songwriter career.

Spitalfield played a secret show on October 6, 2012 at Santos Party House in Tribeca, Manhattan under the name The Cloak & Dagger Club (the name of the band's first EP).

== Discography ==
=== Albums ===
- Faster Crashes Harder (2001)
- Remember Right Now (2003)
- Stop Doing Bad Things (2005)
- Better than Knowing Where You Are (2006)

=== Collections ===
- Everything 1998-2002 (2007)

=== EPs ===
- Capture the Moment (1998)
- Don't Worry About It Loves Spitalfield (2000, 12" split record with Don't Worry About It)
- The Cloak & Dagger Club EP (2002)
- Play + Record (2025)

=== Singles ===
- "I Loved the Way She Said 'L.A.'" (2003)
- "Those Days You Felt Alive" (2003)
- "Gold Dust Vs. the State of Illinois" (2005)
- "Secrets in Mirrors" (2006)
- "Remembering Right Now" (2025)
- "I Can't Stop" (2025)

"Secrets in Mirrors" was pre-loaded in the Walkman NW-E013 model.

=== Non-album tracks ===
- "It's Cold Out There" – released on A Santa Cause 2: It's a Punk Rock Christmas (2006)
- "The Yearbook Song" - unreleased (2001)

== Band members ==
- Mark Rose - vocals, guitar
- Drew Brown - drums
- Daniel Lowder - guitar, backing vocals
- T. J. Minich - bass, vocals
