= Running from a Gamble =

Running From a Gamble

Studio album by Company of Thieves
- Released: May 17, 2011
- Genre: Indie rock Alternative rock
- Length: 51:09
- Label: Wind-Up

Company of Thieves chronology
Tourniquet: The Acoustic EP (2011)	Running From a Gamble (2011)

Running From a Gamble is the second and final studio album by American indie rock band Company of Thieves. It was released on May 17, 2011.

It was rated an 8.5 out of 10 by IGN.

== Track listing ==
All tracks are written by Marc Walloch and Genevieve Schatz.

No.	Title	Length
1.	"Intro"	0:35
2.	"Queen of Hearts"	3:53
3.	"Modern Waste"	3:13
4.	"Look Both Ways"	3:41
5.	"Never Come Back"	5:00
6.	"Nothing's In the Flowers"	4:31
7.	"Death of Communication"	3:33
8.	"King of Dreams"	4:24
9.	"Gorgeous/Grotesque"	5:51
10.	"Syrup"	3:10
11.	"Tallulah"	3:13
12.	"Won't Go Quietly"	4:49
13.	"After Thought"	5:16
14.	"Keep From Moving" (Bonus track)	3:16
Total length:		51:09
