= Uprising Records =

Record label

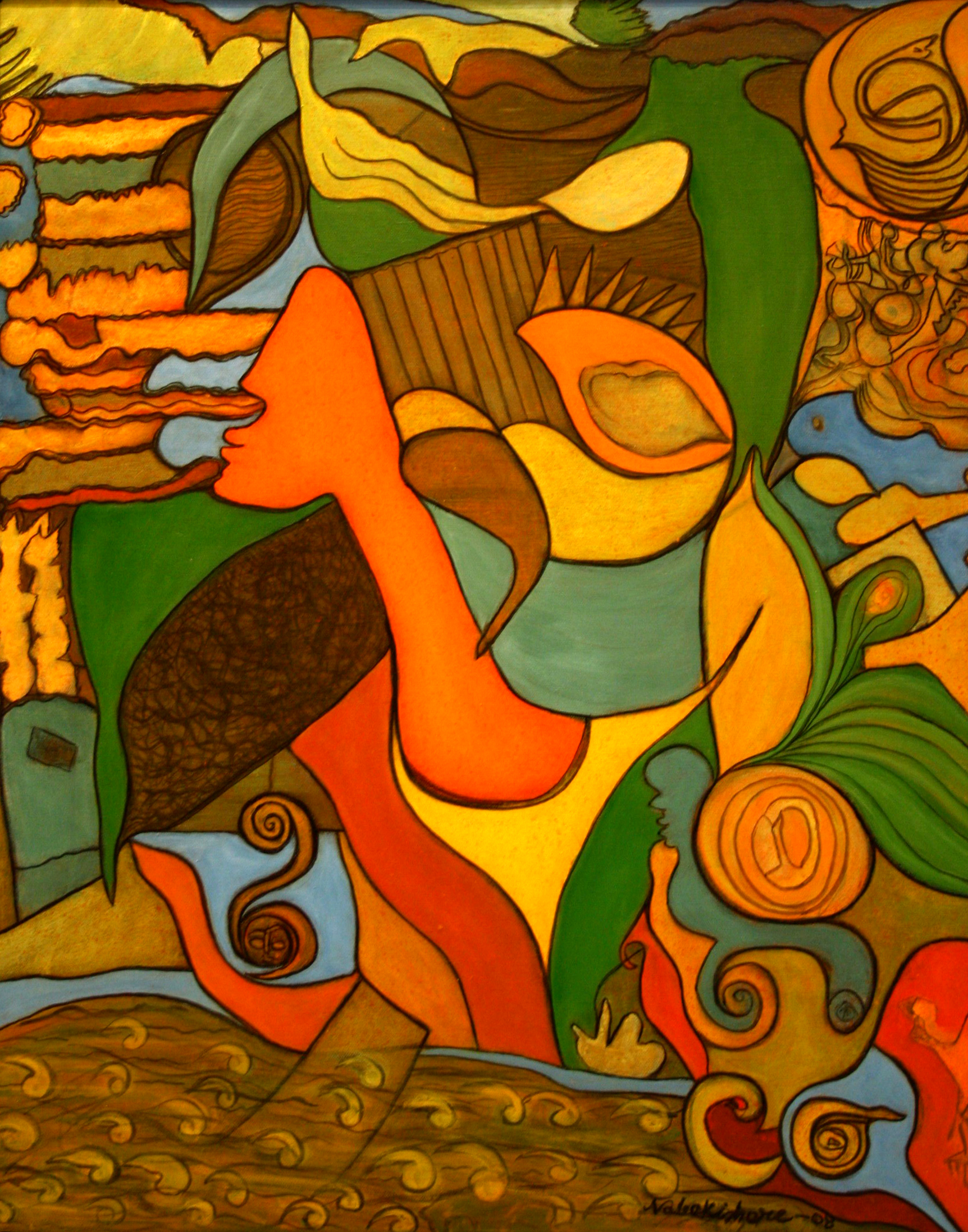
- Founded: 1994
- Founder: Sean Muttaqi
- Distributor(s): RED Distribution
- Genre: Hardcore punk, punk rock, pop punk, hip hop
- Country of origin: United States
- Official website: www.uprisingrecords.com

Uprising Records is a record label founded in 1994 by Sean Muttaqi. It has released records by Fall Out Boy, 7 Angels 7 Plagues, Cipher, Red Knife Lottery, Underminded, Amir Sulaiman, iCON the Mic King, The Crest and more. The label released the mini-LP Fall Out Boy's Evening Out with Your Girlfriend, which has gone on to sell over 127,000 copies in the United States.

== Roster ==
=== Current artists ===
- Amir Sulaiman
- The Crest
- Dylan DillinJah
- Gloria
- Her Demise, My Rise
- I Am the Ocean
- iCON the Mic King
- Katsumoto
- Red Knife Lottery
- Underminded
- Vegan Reich

=== Alumni ===
- Fall Out Boy
- Her Demise My Rise
- Carnifex
- Kid Gorgeous
- My Bitter End
- Nehemiah
- Project Rocket
- Racetraitor
- Ricanstruction
- 7 Angels 7 Plagues
- Culture
- This Moment
- Dr. Acula
- Broadway
- Emmure
- Liferuiner
- Cipher
- T. Mills
- Stretch Armstrong
- Eyes Upon Separation
- Tension
- Unfashion

== See also ==
- List of record labels
