= List of songs recorded by Fall Out Boy =

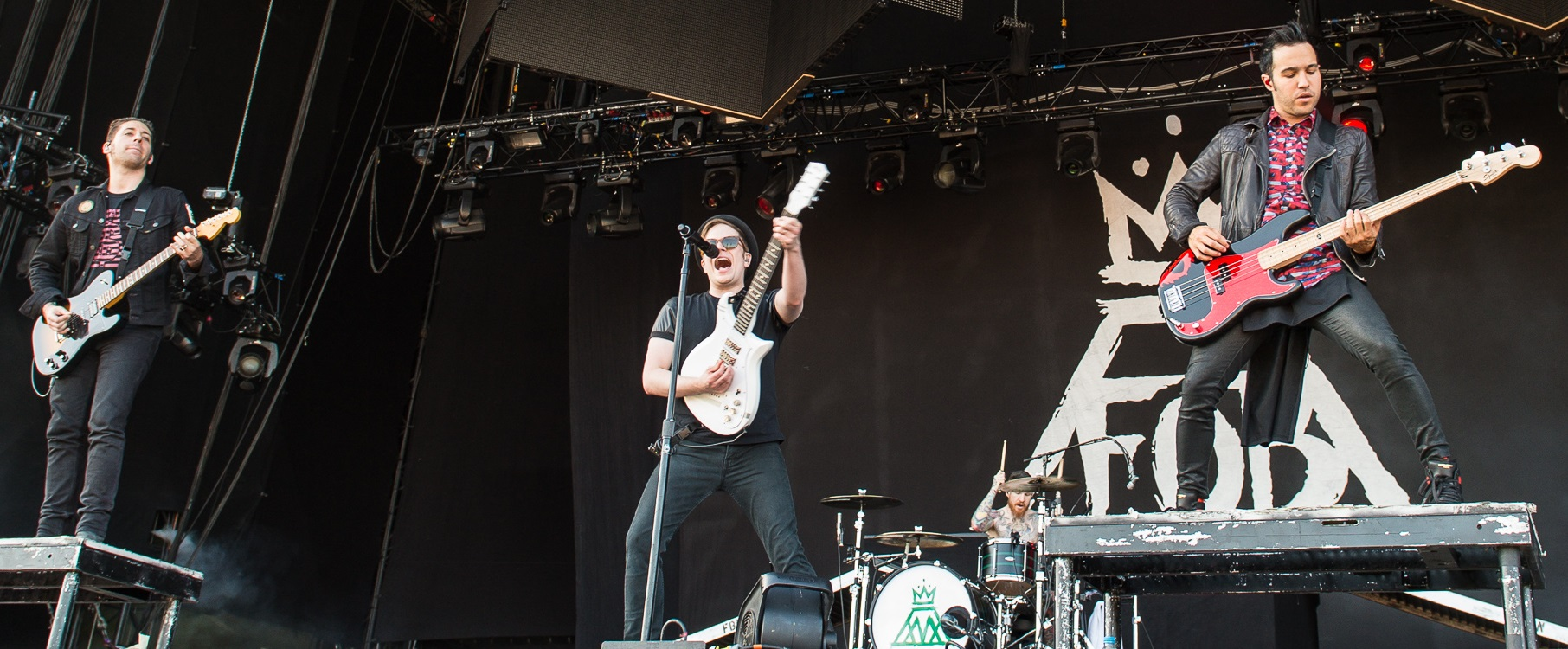
Fall Out Boy performing in 2014. From left to right: Joe Trohman, Patrick Stump, Andy Hurley (rear) and Pete Wentz.

Fall Out Boy is an American pop punk band from Wilmette, Illinois. Formed in 2001, the band is composed of vocalist and guitarist Patrick Stump, bassist Pete Wentz, guitarist Joe Trohman and drummer Andy Hurley. The group's songwriting is typically led by Wentz (lyrics) and Stump (lyrics/singing), although both Trohman and Hurley are also co-credited for the band's compositions. After a number of extended plays (EPs) and a mini album, the band released its debut full-length album Take This to Your Grave in May 2003. In the same year, the band released a cover of Jawbreaker's "Save Your Generation", as well as the Christmas-themed "Yule Shoot Your Eye Out".

In 2004 the band released three new songs on the EP My Heart Will Always Be the B-Side to My Tongue, which was followed in 2005 by second album From Under the Cork Tree. Infinity on High was released in 2007, when the band also collaborated with Timbaland on "One and Only". The following year they released a cover of Michael Jackson's "Beat It" featuring John Mayer, as well as their fourth album Folie à Deux. In 2009, Fall Out Boy went on hiatus and released the compilation album Believers Never Die.

Fall Out Boy returned in 2013 with Save Rock and Roll, which featured a range of guest contributors including Courtney Love and Elton John. Later in the year they also released PAX AM Days, a short EP influenced by the band's hardcore punk background. In 2014 the band contributed the single "Immortals" to the Big Hero 6 soundtrack, which was later featured on their sixth studio album American Beauty/American Psycho. In 2016, the group recorded a cover of the Ghostbusters theme song with Missy Elliott for the film of the same name. In 2018, the band released their 7th album, MANIA, which was their last album until 2023, when they released their 8th studio album, So Much (for) Stardust.

== Songs ==
Key
†	Indicates song released as a single.
‡	Indicates songs written solely by Fall Out Boy.
#	Indicates song released on a special edition of the album only.

Title	Credited artist(s)	Writer(s)	Release	Year	Ref.
"20 Dollar Nose Bleed"	Fall Out Boy featuring Brendon Urie	Patrick Stump; Pete Wentz; Joe Trohman; Andy Hurley ‡	Folie à Deux	2008	
"27"	Fall Out Boy	Patrick Stump; Pete Wentz; Joe Trohman; Andy Hurley ‡	Folie à Deux	2008	
"7 Minutes in Heaven (Atavan Halen)"	Fall Out Boy	Patrick Stump; Pete Wentz; Joe Trohman; Andy Hurley ‡	From Under the Cork Tree	2005	
"A Little Less Sixteen Candles, a Little More "Touch Me"" †	Fall Out Boy	Patrick Stump; Pete Wentz; Joe Trohman; Andy Hurley ‡	From Under the Cork Tree	2005	
"Alone Together" †	Fall Out Boy	Patrick Stump; Pete Wentz; Joe Trohman; Andy Hurley ‡	Save Rock and Roll	2013	
"Alpha Dog" †	Fall Out Boy	Patrick Stump; Pete Wentz; Joe Trohman; Andy Hurley ‡	Welcome to the New Administration (Note: Released as a demo titled "ALPHAdog and OMEGAlomaniac.) and Believers Never Die: Greatest Hits	2008 and 2009	
"America's Suitehearts" †	Fall Out Boy	Patrick Stump; Pete Wentz; Joe Trohman; Andy Hurley ‡	Folie à Deux	2008	
"American Beauty/American Psycho" †	Fall Out Boy	Patrick Stump; Pete Wentz; Joe Trohman; Andy Hurley; Sebastian Akchoté-Bozovic; Nikki Sixx	American Beauty/American Psycho	2015	
"American Beauty/American Psycho" (Remix)	Fall Out Boy featuring ASAP Ferg	Patrick Stump; Pete Wentz; Joe Trohman; Andy Hurley; Sebastian Akchoté-Bozovic; Nikki Sixx; Darold Brown	Make America Psycho Again	2015	
"American Made"	Fall Out Boy	Patrick Stump; Pete Wentz; Joe Trohman; Andy Hurley ‡	PAX AM Days	2013	
"Art of Keeping Up Disappearances"	Fall Out Boy	Patrick Stump; Pete Wentz; Joe Trohman; Andy Hurley ‡	PAX AM Days	2013	
"Baby Annihilation"	Fall Out Boy	Patrick Stump; Pete Wentz; Joe Trohman; Andy Hurley ‡	So Much (for) Stardust	2023	
"Back to Earth" †	Steve Aoki featuring Fall Out Boy	Steve Aoki; Patrick Stump; Pete Wentz; Joe Trohman; Andy Hurley	Neon Future I	2014	
"Bang the Doldrums"	Fall Out Boy	Patrick Stump; Pete Wentz; Joe Trohman; Andy Hurley; Wesley Eisold	Infinity on High	2007	
"Beat It" †	Fall Out Boy featuring John Mayer	Michael Jackson	Live in Phoenix and Folie à Deux # (Note: Included on the Australian Deluxe, New Zealand Deluxe, Japanese, UK, and Latin American editions of the album)	2008	
"Bishops Knife Trick"	Fall Out Boy	Patrick Stump; Pete Wentz; Joe Trohman; Andy Hurley ‡	M A N I A	2018	
"Bob Dylan"	Fall Out Boy	Patrick Stump; Pete Wentz; Joe Trohman; Andy Hurley ‡	Greatest Hits: Believers Never Die – Volume Two	2019	
"Caffeine Cold"	Fall Out Boy	Patrick Stump; Pete Wentz; Joe Trohman; Andy Hurley ‡	PAX AM Days	2013	
"Calm Before the Storm"	Fall Out Boy	Patrick Stump; Pete Wentz; Joe Trohman; Andy Hurley ‡	Take This to Your Grave	2003	
"Catch Me If You Can/Proclamation of Emancipation"	Fall Out Boy featuring Travis McCoy		Welcome to the New Administration	2008	
"Centuries" †	Fall Out Boy	Patrick Stump; Pete Wentz; Joe Trohman; Andy Hurley; J.R. Rotem; Michael Fonseca; Raja Kumari; Justin Tranter; Suzanne Vega	American Beauty/American Psycho	2015	
"Centuries" (Remix)	Fall Out Boy featuring Juicy J	Patrick Stump; Pete Wentz; Joe Trohman; Andy Hurley; J.R. Rotem; Michael Fonseca; Raja Kumari; Justin Tranter; Suzanne Vega	Make America Psycho Again	2015	
"Champagne for My Real Friends, Real Pain for My Sham Friends"	Fall Out Boy	Patrick Stump; Pete Wentz; Joe Trohman; Andy Hurley ‡	From Under the Cork Tree	2005	
"Champion"	Fall Out Boy	Patrick Stump; Pete Wentz; Joe Trohman; Andy Hurley; Sia Furler; Jesse Shatkin	M A N I A	2018	
"Champion" (Remix)	Fall Out Boy featuring RM	Patrick Stump; Pete Wentz; Joe Trohman; Andy Hurley; Sia Furler; Jesse Shatkin	M A N I A# (Note: Included on the Japanese edition of the album)	2018	
"Chicago Is So Two Years Ago"	Fall Out Boy	Patrick Stump; Pete Wentz; Joe Trohman; Andy Hurley ‡	Take This to Your Grave	2003	
"Church"	Fall Out Boy	Patrick Stump; Pete Wentz; Joe Trohman; Andy Hurley; Audra Mae; Kate York; Andrew Wells	M A N I A	2018	
"Church" (Remix)	Fall Out Boy featuring nothing,nowhere	Patrick Stump; Pete Wentz; Joe Trohman; Andy Hurley; Audra Mae; Kate York; Andrew Wells	Greatest Hits: Believers Never Die – Volume Two# (Note: Included on the Japanese edition of the album)	2019	
"City in a Garden"	Fall Out Boy	Patrick Stump; Pete Wentz; Joe Trohman; Andy Hurley ‡	Lake Effect Kid	2019	
"(Coffee's for Closers)"	Fall Out Boy	Patrick Stump; Pete Wentz; Joe Trohman; Andy Hurley ‡	Folie à Deux	2008	
"Dance, Dance" †	Fall Out Boy	Patrick Stump; Pete Wentz; Joe Trohman; Andy Hurley ‡	From Under the Cork Tree	2005	
"Dead on Arrival" †	Fall Out Boy	Patrick Stump; Pete Wentz; Joe Trohman; Andy Hurley ‡	Take This to Your Grave	2003	
"Dear Future Self (Hands Up)"	Fall Out Boy featuring Wyclef Jean	Patrick Stump; Pete Wentz; Joe Trohman; Andy Hurley; Wyclef Jean; Jens Siverstedt; Jonas Wallin; Noonie Bao; Alina Smith; Annalise Morelli	Greatest Hits: Believers Never Die – Volume Two	2019	
"Death Valley"	Fall Out Boy	Patrick Stump; Pete Wentz; Joe Trohman; Andy Hurley ‡	Save Rock and Roll	2013	
"Demigods"	Fall Out Boy	Patrick Stump; Pete Wentz; Joe Trohman; Andy Hurley ‡	PAX AM Days	2013	
"Disloyal Order of Water Buffaloes"	Fall Out Boy	Patrick Stump; Pete Wentz; Joe Trohman; Andy Hurley ‡	Folie à Deux	2008	
"Don't You Know Who I Think I Am?"	Fall Out Boy	Patrick Stump; Pete Wentz; Joe Trohman; Andy Hurley ‡	Infinity on High	2007	
"Electric Touch" (Taylor's Version) (From the Vault)	Taylor Swift featuring Fall Out Boy	Taylor Swift	Speak Now (Taylor's Version)	2023	
"Eternal Summer"	Fall Out Boy	Patrick Stump; Pete Wentz; Joe Trohman; Andy Hurley ‡	PAX AM Days	2013	
"Fake Out"	Fall Out Boy	Patrick Stump; Pete Wentz; Joe Trohman; Andy Hurley ‡	So Much (for) Stardust	2023	
"Fame < Infamy"	Fall Out Boy	Patrick Stump; Pete Wentz; Joe Trohman; Andy Hurley ‡	Infinity on High	2007	
"Favorite Record"	Fall Out Boy	Patrick Stump; Pete Wentz; Joe Trohman; Andy Hurley ‡	American Beauty/American Psycho	2015	
"Favorite Record" (Remix)	Fall Out Boy featuring ILoveMakonnen	Patrick Stump; Pete Wentz; Joe Trohman; Andy Hurley; Makonnen Sheran	Make America Psycho Again	2015	
"Flu Game"	Fall Out Boy	Patrick Stump; Pete Wentz; Joe Trohman; Andy Hurley ‡	So Much (for) Stardust	2023	
"Footprints in the Snow"	Frosty and the Nightmare Making Machine	Patrick Stump; Pete Wentz; Joe Trohman; Andy Hurley ‡	Llamania	2018	
"Fourth of July"	Fall Out Boy	Patrick Stump; Pete Wentz; Joe Trohman; Andy Hurley; Ryan Lott; Jake Sinclair	American Beauty/American Psycho	2015	
"Fourth of July" (Remix)	Fall Out Boy featuring OG Maco	Patrick Stump; Pete Wentz; Joe Trohman; Andy Hurley; Ryan Lott; Jake Sinclair; Benedict Chiajulam Ihesiaba Jr.	Make America Psycho Again	2015	
""From Now on, We Are Enemies""	Fall Out Boy	Patrick Stump; Pete Wentz; Joe Trohman; Andy Hurley ‡	Believers Never Die: Greatest Hits # (Note: Included as a bonus track)	2009	
"Get Busy Living or Get Busy Dying (Do Your Part to Save the Scene and Stop Going to Shows)"	Fall Out Boy	Patrick Stump; Pete Wentz; Joe Trohman; Andy Hurley ‡	From Under the Cork Tree	2005	
"Ghostbusters (I'm Not Afraid)" †	Fall Out Boy featuring Missy Elliott	Ray Parker Jr. Melissa Elliott	Ghostbusters	2016	
"G.I.N.A.S.F.S." ("Gay Is Not a Synonym for Shitty")	Fall Out Boy	Patrick Stump; Pete Wentz; Joe Trohman; Andy Hurley ‡	Infinity on High # (Note: Included on the deluxe edition; the UK, Australian, and New Zealand editions; and the Australian/New Zealand tour edition)	2007	
"Golden"	Fall Out Boy	Patrick Stump; Pete Wentz; Joe Trohman; Andy Hurley; Wesley Eisold	Infinity on High	2007	
"Grand Theft Autumn/Where Is Your Boy" †	Fall Out Boy	Patrick Stump; Pete Wentz; Joe Trohman; Andy Hurley ‡	Take This to Your Grave	2003	
"Grenade Jumper"	Fall Out Boy featuring Jeff Warren	Patrick Stump; Pete Wentz; Joe Trohman; Andy Hurley ‡	Take This to Your Grave	2003	
"Growing Up"	Fall Out Boy	Patrick Stump; Pete Wentz; Joe Trohman; T.J. Kunasch	Project Rocket/Fall Out Boy	2002	
"Hand Crushed by a Mallet (remix)" †	100 gecs featuring Fall Out Boy, Craig Owens, and Nicole Dollanganger	Dylan Brady; Laura Les	1000 Gecs and the Tree of Clues	2020	
"Headfirst Slide into Cooperstown on a Bad Bet" †	Fall Out Boy	Patrick Stump; Pete Wentz; Joe Trohman; Andy Hurley ‡	Folie à Deux	2008	
"Heartbreak Feels So Good"	Fall Out Boy	Patrick Stump; Pete Wentz; Joe Trohman; Andy Hurley ‡	So Much (for) Stardust	2023	
"Heaven, Iowa"	Fall Out Boy	Patrick Stump; Pete Wentz; Joe Trohman; Andy Hurley ‡	So Much (for) Stardust	2023	
"Heaven's Gate"	Fall Out Boy	Patrick Stump; Pete Wentz; Joe Trohman; Andy Hurley ‡	M A N I A	2018	
"HOLD ME TIGHT OR DONT"	Fall Out Boy	Patrick Stump; Pete Wentz; Joe Trohman; Andy Hurley; Jonny Coffer; Taylor Upsahl	M A N I A	2018	
"Hold Me Like A Grudge"	Fall Out Boy	Patrick Stump; Pete Wentz; Joe Trohman; Andy Hurley ‡	So Much (for) Stardust	2023	
"Homesick at Space Camp"	Fall Out Boy	Patrick Stump; Pete Wentz; Joe Trohman; Andy Hurley ‡	Take This to Your Grave	2003	
"Honorable Mention"	Fall Out Boy	Patrick Stump; Pete Wentz; Joe Trohman; T.J. Kunasch; Mike Pareskuwicz ‡	Fall Out Boy's Evening Out with Your Girlfriend	2003	
"Hot to the Touch, Cold on the Inside"	Fall Out Boy	Patrick Stump; Pete Wentz; Joe Trohman; Andy Hurley ‡	PAX AM Days	2013	
"Hum Hallelujah"	Fall Out Boy	Patrick Stump; Pete Wentz; Joe Trohman; Andy Hurley; Leonard Cohen	Infinity on High	2007	
"I Am My Own Muse"	Fall Out Boy	Patrick Stump; Pete Wentz; Joe Trohman; Andy Hurley ‡	So Much (for) Stardust	2023	
"I Don't Care" †	Fall Out Boy	Patrick Stump; Pete Wentz; Joe Trohman; Andy Hurley; Norman Greenbaum	Folie à Deux	2008	
"I Don't Care (27)" (Note: A demo/snippet version of the track.)	Fall Out Boy featuring Clinton Sparks and Seth Green	Patrick Stump; Pete Wentz; Joe Trohman; Andy Hurley; Norman Greenbaum	Welcome to the New Administration	2008	
"I Slept with Someone in Fall Out Boy and All I Got Was This Stupid Song Written About Me"	Fall Out Boy featuring Chad Gilbert	Patrick Stump; Pete Wentz; Joe Trohman; Andy Hurley ‡	From Under the Cork Tree	2005	
"I Wan'na Be Like You (The Monkey Song)"	Fall Out Boy	Robert B. Sherman; Richard M. Sherman	We Love Disney	2015	
"I'm Like a Lawyer with the Way I'm Always Trying to Get You Off (Me & You)" †	Fall Out Boy	Patrick Stump; Pete Wentz; Joe Trohman; Andy Hurley ‡	Infinity on High	2007	
"Immortals" †	Fall Out Boy	Patrick Stump; Pete Wentz; Joe Trohman; Andy Hurley ‡	Big Hero 6 and American Beauty/American Psycho	2014	
"Immortals" (Remix)	Fall Out Boy featuring Black Thought	Patrick Stump; Pete Wentz; Joe Trohman; Andy Hurley ‡	Make America Psycho Again	2015	
"Irresistible" †	Fall Out Boy	Patrick Stump; Pete Wentz; Joe Trohman; Andy Hurley ‡	American Beauty/American Psycho	2015	
"Irresistible" (Remix)	Fall Out Boy featuring Demi Lovato	Patrick Stump; Pete Wentz; Joe Trohman; Andy Hurley ‡	Make America Psycho Again	2015	
"Irresistible" (Remix)	Fall Out Boy featuring Migos	Patrick Stump; Pete Wentz; Joe Trohman; Andy Hurley; Quavious Marshall; Kirsnick Ball	Make America Psycho Again	2015	
"It's a Small World"	Ne-Yo; Jessie J Jason Derulo; Gwen Stefani; Ariana Grande; Jhené Aiko; Fall Out Boy; Tori Kelly; Kacey Musgraves; Charles Perry; Jessie Ware; Olly Murs; Robbie Williams	Robert B. Sherman; Richard M. Sherman	We Love Disney	2015	
"It's Hard to Say "I Do" When I Don't"	Fall Out Boy	Patrick Stump; Pete Wentz; Joe Trohman; Andy Hurley ‡	Infinity on High# (Note: Included on the deluxe, Japanese, and Australia/New Zealand tour editions)	2007	
""It's Not a Side Effect of the Cocaine, I Am Thinking It Must Be Love""	Fall Out Boy	Patrick Stump; Pete Wentz; Joe Trohman; Andy Hurley ‡	My Heart Will Always Be the B-Side to My Tongue	2004	
"I've Been Waiting"	Lil Peep and ILoveMakonnen featuring Fall Out Boy	Louis Bell; Makonnen Sheran; Gustav Åhr; Andy Hurley; Brenton Duvall; Joseph Trohman; Valentin Leon Blavatnik; Patrick Stump; Brian Lee; Pete Wentz	Greatest Hits: Believers Never Die – Volume Two (Note: A version without Fall Out Boy was included on Lil Peep's 2019 compilation album Everybody's Everything.)	2019	
"I've Got a Dark Alley and a Bad Idea That Says You Should Shut Your Mouth (Summer Song)"	Fall Out Boy	Patrick Stump; Pete Wentz; Joe Trohman; Andy Hurley ‡	From Under the Cork Tree	2005	
"I've Got All This Ringing in My Ears and None on My Fingers"	Fall Out Boy	Patrick Stump; Pete Wentz; Joe Trohman; Andy Hurley ‡	Infinity on High	2007	
"Jet Pack Blues"	Fall Out Boy	Patrick Stump; Pete Wentz; Joe Trohman; Andy Hurley ‡	American Beauty/American Psycho	2015	
"Jet Pack Blues" (Remix)	Fall Out Boy featuring Big K.R.I.T.	Patrick Stump; Pete Wentz; Joe Trohman; Andy Hurley; Justin Scott	Make America Psycho Again	2015	
"Just One Yesterday"	Fall Out Boy featuring Foxes	Patrick Stump; Pete Wentz; Joe Trohman; Andy Hurley ‡	Save Rock and Roll	2013	
"Lake Effect Kid"	Fall Out Boy	Patrick Stump; Pete Wentz; Joe Trohman; Andy Hurley ‡	Welcome to the New Administration (Note: Released as a demo track.) and Lake Effect Kid	2008 and 2019	
"Love From the Other Side"	Fall Out Boy	Patrick Stump; Pete Wentz; Joe Trohman; Andy Hurley ‡	So Much (for) Stardust	2023	
"Love, Sex, Death"	Fall Out Boy	Patrick Stump; Pete Wentz; Joe Trohman; Andy Hurley ‡	PAX AM Days	2013	
"Love Will Tear Us Apart"	Fall Out Boy	Ian Curtis; Peter Hook; Stephen Morris; Bernard Sumner	My Heart Will Always Be the B-Side to My Tongue	2004	
"Lullabye"	Fall Out Boy	Patrick Stump; Pete Wentz; Joe Trohman; Andy Hurley ‡	Folie à Deux # (Note: Included as a pre-gap hidden track on the CD edition)	2008	
"Miss Missing You"	Fall Out Boy	Patrick Stump; Pete Wentz; Joe Trohman; Andy Hurley ‡	Save Rock and Roll	2013	
"Moving Pictures"	Fall Out Boy	Patrick Stump; Pete Wentz; Joe Trohman; T.J. Kunasch	Project Rocket/Fall Out Boy	2002	
"My Heart Is the Worst Kind of Weapon"	Fall Out Boy	Patrick Stump; Pete Wentz; Joe Trohman; Andy Hurley ‡	My Heart Will Always Be the B-Side to My Tongue	2004	
"My Songs Know What You Did in the Dark (Light Em Up)" †	Fall Out Boy	Patrick Stump; Pete Wentz; Joe Trohman; Andy Hurley; Butch Walker; John Hill	Save Rock and Roll	2013	
My Songs Know What You Did in the Dark (Light Em Up)" (2 Chainz Remix)	Fall Out Boy and 2 Chainz	Patrick Stump; Pete Wentz; Joe Trohman; Andy Hurley; Butch Walker; John Hill; Tauheed Epps	Save Rock and Roll# (Note: Included as a Japanese bonus track)	2013	
"Nobody Puts Baby in the Corner"	Fall Out Boy	Patrick Stump; Pete Wentz; Joe Trohman; Andy Hurley ‡	From Under the Cork Tree	2005	
"Novocaine"	Fall Out Boy	Patrick Stump; Pete Wentz; Joe Trohman; Andy Hurley ‡	American Beauty/American Psycho	2015	
"Novocaine" (Remix)	Fall Out Boy featuring Uzi	Patrick Stump; Pete Wentz; Joe Trohman; Andy Hurley; Uzi	Make America Psycho Again	2015	
"Of All the Gin Joints in All the World"	Fall Out Boy	Patrick Stump; Pete Wentz; Joe Trohman; Andy Hurley ‡	From Under the Cork Tree	2005	
"One and Only"	Timbaland featuring Fall Out Boy	Timothy Mosley; Hannon Lane; Patrick Stump; Pete Wentz	Shock Value	2007	
"One of Those Nights"	The Cab featuring Fall Out Boy	Alexander DeLeon; Ian Crawford; Alex T. Marshall; Cash Colligan; Alex Johnson; Patrick Stump	Whisper War	2008	
"Our Lawyer Made Us Change the Name of This Song So We Wouldn't Get Sued"	Fall Out Boy	Patrick Stump; Pete Wentz; Joe Trohman; Andy Hurley ‡	From Under the Cork Tree	2005	
"Parker Lewis Can't Lose (But I'm Gonna Give It My Best Shot)"	Fall Out Boy	Patrick Stump; Pete Wentz; Joe Trohman; T.J. Kunasch; Mike Pareskuwicz ‡	Fall Out Boy's Evening Out with Your Girlfriend	2003	
"Past Life"	Frosty and the Nightmare Making Machine	Patrick Stump; Pete Wentz; Joe Trohman; Andy Hurley ‡	Llamania	2018	
"Pavlove"	Fall Out Boy	Patrick Stump; Pete Wentz; Joe Trohman; Andy Hurley ‡	Folie à Deux # (Note: Included on the deluxe and Japanese editions)	2008	
"Pretty in Punk"	Fall Out Boy	Patrick Stump; Pete Wentz; Joe Trohman; T.J. Kunasch; Mike Pareskuwicz ‡	Fall Out Boy's Evening Out with Your Girlfriend	2003	
"Rat a Tat"	Fall Out Boy featuring Courtney Love	Patrick Stump; Pete Wentz; Joe Trohman; Andy Hurley; Courtney Love	Save Rock and Roll	2013	
"Reinventing the Wheel to Run Myself Over"	Fall Out Boy	Patrick Stump; Pete Wentz; Joe Trohman; Andy Hurley ‡	Take This to Your Grave	2003	
"Roxanne"	Fall Out Boy	Gordon Sumner	Take This to Your Grave # (Note: Included as a Director's Cut bonus track)	2005	
"Saturday" †	Fall Out Boy	Patrick Stump; Pete Wentz; Joe Trohman; Andy Hurley ‡	Take This to Your Grave	2003	
"Saturday Night's Alright for Fighting"	Fall Out Boy	Elton John; Bernie Taupin	Goodbye Yellow Brick Road: Revisited & Beyond	2014	
"Save Rock and Roll"	Fall Out Boy featuring Elton John	Patrick Stump; Pete Wentz; Joe Trohman; Andy Hurley ‡	Save Rock and Roll	2013	
"Save Your Generation"	Fall Out Boy	Blake Schwarzenbach; Chris Bauermeister; Adam Pfahler	Bad Scene, Everyone's Fault: Jawbreaker Tribute	2003	
"Sending Postcards from a Plane Crash (Wish You Were Here)"	Fall Out Boy	Patrick Stump; Pete Wentz; Joe Trohman; Andy Hurley ‡	Take This to Your Grave	2003	
"She's My Winona"	Fall Out Boy	Patrick Stump; Pete Wentz; Joe Trohman; Andy Hurley ‡	Folie à Deux	2008	
"Short, Fast and Loud"	Fall Out Boy	Patrick Stump; Pete Wentz; Joe Trohman; T.J. Kunasch; Mike Pareskuwicz ‡	Fall Out Boy's Evening Out with Your Girlfriend	2003	
"Snitches and Talkers Get Stitches and Walkers"	Fall Out Boy	Patrick Stump; Pete Wentz; Joe Trohman; Andy Hurley ‡	From Under the Cork Tree# (Note: Included on the Limited "Black Clouds and Underdogs" edition)	2006	
"So Good Right Now"	Fall Out Boy	Patrick Stump; Pete Wentz; Joe Trohman; Andy Hurley; Robert Byrd	So Much (for) Stardust	2023	
"So Much (For) Stardust"	Fall Out Boy	Patrick Stump; Pete Wentz; Joe Trohman; Andy Hurley ‡	So Much (for) Stardust	2023	
"Sophomore Slump or Comeback of the Year"	Fall Out Boy featuring William Beckett	Patrick Stump; Pete Wentz; Joe Trohman; Andy Hurley ‡	From Under the Cork Tree	2005	
"Start Today"	Fall Out Boy	Walter Schreifels	Tony Hawk's American Wasteland	2005	
"Stay Frosty Royal Milk Tea"	Fall Out Boy	Patrick Stump; Pete Wentz; Joe Trohman; Andy Hurley ‡	M A N I A	2018	
"Stayin Out All Night" (Boys of Zummer Remix)	Wiz Khalifa and Fall Out Boy	Cameron Thomaz; Lukasz Gottwald; Nick Ruth; Henry Walter	"Stayin Out All Night"	2014	
"Sugar, We're Goin Down" †	Fall Out Boy	Patrick Stump; Pete Wentz; Joe Trohman; Andy Hurley ‡	From Under the Cork Tree	2005	
"Sunshine Riptide"	Fall Out Boy featuring Burna Boy	Patrick Stump; Pete Wentz; Joe Trohman; Andy Hurley ‡	M A N I A	2018	
"Super Fade"	Fall Out Boy	Patrick Stump; Pete Wentz; Joe Trohman; Andy Hurley ‡	Lake Effect Kid	2019	
"Switchblades and Infidelity"	Fall Out Boy	Patrick Stump; Pete Wentz; Joe Trohman; T.J. Kunasch	Project Rocket/Fall Out Boy	2002	
""Tell That Mick He Just Made My List of Things to Do Today""	Fall Out Boy	Patrick Stump; Pete Wentz; Joe Trohman; Andy Hurley ‡	Take This to Your Grave	2003	
"The (After) Life of the Party"	Fall Out Boy	Patrick Stump; Pete Wentz; Joe Trohman; Andy Hurley ‡	Infinity on High	2007	
"The Carpal Tunnel of Love" †	Fall Out Boy	Patrick Stump; Pete Wentz; Joe Trohman; Andy Hurley; Wesley Eisold	Infinity on High	2007	
"The Kids Aren't Alright"	Fall Out Boy	Patrick Stump; Pete Wentz; Joe Trohman; Andy Hurley ‡	American Beauty/American Psycho	2015	
"The Kids Aren't Alright" (Remix)	Fall Out Boy featuring Azealia Banks	Patrick Stump; Pete Wentz; Joe Trohman; Andy Hurley; Kevin James; Azealia Banks	Make America Psycho Again	2015	
"The Kintsugi Kid (Ten Years)"	Fall Out Boy	Patrick Stump; Pete Wentz; Joe Trohman; Andy Hurley ‡	So Much (for) Stardust	2023	
"The Last of the Real Ones"	Fall Out Boy	Patrick Stump; Pete Wentz; Joe Trohman; Andy Hurley; Carlo Montagnese	M A N I A	2018	
"The Mighty Fall"	Fall Out Boy featuring Big Sean	Patrick Stump; Pete Wentz; Joe Trohman; Andy Hurley; Butch Walker; John Hill; Sean Anderson	Save Rock and Roll	2013	
"The Music or the Misery"	Fall Out Boy	Patrick Stump; Pete Wentz; Joe Trohman; Andy Hurley ‡	From Under the Cork Tree#	2005	
"The Patron Saint of Liars and Fakes"	Fall Out Boy	Patrick Stump; Pete Wentz; Joe Trohman; Andy Hurley ‡	Take This to Your Grave	2003	
"The Phoenix" †	Fall Out Boy	Patrick Stump; Pete Wentz; Joe Trohman; Andy Hurley ‡	Save Rock and Roll	2013	
"The Pink Seashell"	Fall Out Boy featuring Ethan Hawke	Patrick Stump; Pete Wentz; Joe Trohman; Andy Hurley; Ethan Hawke	So Much (for) Stardust	2023	
"The Pros and Cons of Breathing"	Fall Out Boy	Patrick Stump; Pete Wentz; Joe Trohman; Andy Hurley ‡	Take This to Your Grave	2003	
"The (Shipped) Gold Standard"	Fall Out Boy	Patrick Stump; Pete Wentz; Joe Trohman; Andy Hurley ‡	Folie à Deux	2008	
""The Take Over, the Breaks Over"" †	Fall Out Boy	Patrick Stump; Pete Wentz; Joe Trohman; Andy Hurley ‡	Infinity on High	2007	
"The World's Not Waiting (For Five Tired Boys in a Broken Down Van)"	Fall Out Boy	Patrick Stump; Pete Wentz; Joe Trohman; T.J. Kunasch; Mike Pareskuwicz ‡	Fall Out Boy's Evening Out with Your Girlfriend	2003	
"This Ain't a Scene, It's an Arms Race" †	Fall Out Boy	Patrick Stump; Pete Wentz; Joe Trohman; Andy Hurley ‡	Infinity on High	2007	
"Thnks fr th Mmrs" †	Fall Out Boy	Patrick Stump; Pete Wentz; Joe Trohman; Andy Hurley ‡	Infinity on High	2007	
"Thriller"	Fall Out Boy featuring Jay-Z	Patrick Stump; Pete Wentz; Joe Trohman; Andy Hurley ‡	Infinity on High	2007	
"Tiffany Blews"	Fall Out Boy featuring Lil Wayne and Alexander DeLeon	Patrick Stump; Pete Wentz; Joe Trohman; Andy Hurley ‡	Folie à Deux	2008	
"Twin Skeleton's (Hotel in NYC)"	Fall Out Boy	Patrick Stump; Pete Wentz; Joe Trohman; Andy Hurley ‡	American Beauty/American Psycho	2015	
"Twin Skeleton's (Hotel in NYC)" (Remix)	Fall Out Boy featuring Joey Badass	Patrick Stump; Pete Wentz; Joe Trohman; Andy Hurley; Jo-Vaugh Scott	Make America Psycho Again	2015	
"Uma Thurman" †	Fall Out Boy	Patrick Stump; Pete Wentz; Joe Trohman; Andy Hurley; Jake Sinclair; Waqaas Hashmi; Jarrel Young; Liam O'Donnell; Jack Marshall; Bob Mosher	American Beauty/American Psycho	2015	
"Uma Thurman" (Fall Out Boy vs. Didrick) (Extended Version)	Fall Out Boy	Patrick Stump; Pete Wentz; Joe Trohman; Andy Hurley; Jake Sinclair; Waqaas Hashmi; Jarrel Young; Liam O'Donnell; Jack Marshall; Bob Mosher	Make America Psycho Again#	2015	
"Uma Thurman" (Remix)	Fall Out Boy featuring Wiz Khalifa	Patrick Stump; Pete Wentz; Joe Trohman; Andy Hurley; Jake Sinclair; Waqaas Hashmi; Jarrel Young; Liam O'Donnell; Jack Marshall; Bob Mosher; Cameron Thomaz	Make America Psycho Again	2015	
"Untitled 1 (Colorado Song) (Unfinished Demo)"	Fall Out Boy	Patrick Stump; Pete Wentz; Joe Trohman; Andy Hurley ‡	Take This to Your Grave # (Note: Included on the 20th Anniversary Edition)	2023	
"Untitled 2 (Jakus Song) (Unfinished Demo)"	Fall Out Boy	Patrick Stump; Pete Wentz; Joe Trohman; Andy Hurley ‡	Take This to Your Grave #	2023	
"w.a.m.s."	Fall Out Boy	Patrick Stump; Pete Wentz; Joe Trohman; Andy Hurley; Pharrell Williams	Folie à Deux	2008	
We Didn't Start The Fire †	Fall Out Boy	Billy Joel; Pete Wentz	So Much (for) Stardust # (Note: Included on the digital edition)	2023	
"We Were Doomed from the Start (The King Is Dead)"	Fall Out Boy	Patrick Stump; Pete Wentz; Joe Trohman; Andy Hurley ‡	PAX AM Days	2013	
"West Coast Smoker"	Fall Out Boy featuring Debbie Harry	Patrick Stump; Pete Wentz; Joe Trohman; Andy Hurley ‡	Folie à Deux	2008	
"What a Catch, Donnie" †	Fall Out Boy featuring Brendon Urie, Alexander DeLeon, William Beckett, Elvis Costello, Travis McCoy, Doug Neumann, and Gabe Saporta	Patrick Stump; Pete Wentz; Joe Trohman; Andy Hurley ‡	Folie à Deux	2008	
"What A Time To Be Alive"	Fall Out Boy	Patrick Stump; Pete Wentz; Joe Trohman; Andy Hurley ‡	So Much (for) Stardust	2023	
"What's This?"	Fall Out Boy	Danny Elfman	The Nightmare Before Christmas # (Note: Included on the 2006 reissue bonus disc)	2006	
"Where Did the Party Go"	Fall Out Boy	Patrick Stump; Pete Wentz; Joe Trohman; Andy Hurley ‡	Save Rock and Roll	2013	
"Wilson (Expensive Mistakes)"	Fall Out Boy	Patrick Stump; Pete Wentz; Joe Trohman; Andy Hurley ‡	M A N I A	2018	
"Wrong Side of Paradise"	Frosty and the Nightmare Making Machine	Patrick Stump; Pete Wentz; Joe Trohman; Andy Hurley ‡	Llamania	2018	
"XO"	Fall Out Boy	Patrick Stump; Pete Wentz; Joe Trohman; Andy Hurley ‡	From Under the Cork Tree	2005	
"Yule Shoot Your Eye Out"	Fall Out Boy	Patrick Stump; Pete Wentz; Joe Trohman; Andy Hurley ‡	A Santa Cause: It's a Punk Rock Christmas	2003	
"You're Crashing But You're No Wave"	Fall Out Boy	Patrick Stump; Pete Wentz; Joe Trohman; Andy Hurley ‡	Infinity on High	2007	
"Young and Menace"	Fall Out Boy	Patrick Stump; Pete Wentz; Joe Trohman; Andy Hurley ‡	M A N I A	2018	
"Young Volcanoes" †	Fall Out Boy	Patrick Stump; Pete Wentz; Joe Trohman; Andy Hurley ‡	Save Rock and Roll	2013	
