= American Beauty/American Psycho Tour =

2015 concert tour by Fall Out Boy

- Tour by Fall Out Boy
- Promotional poster for the tour
- Associated album: American Beauty/American Psycho
- Start date: May 3, 2015
- End date: October 25, 2015
- No. of shows: 60

Fall Out Boy concert chronology
- Monumentour (2014); American Beauty/American Psycho Tour (2015); Wintour is Coming (2016)

The American Beauty/American Psycho Tour was a concert tour by American rock band Fall Out Boy. Supporting the band's sixth studio album American Beauty/American Psycho (2015), the tour visited North America and Europe in 2015. The North American leg was co-headlined with American rapper Wiz Khalifa under the name The Boys of Zummer. The Boys of Zummer leg with Wiz Khalifa ranked fifty-ninth for Pollstar's Year End Top 200 North American Tours of 2015, grossing $18.2 million.

== Background and development ==
In 2013, the band released their fifth album Save Rock and Roll. To support the record, the band toured between 2013 and 2014, during the Save Rock and Roll Tour and the Monumentour with Paramore. In late 2014 during Momunentour, the band started working on the new album, which was almost finished around November and was released in January 2015.

The band played two small venue release shows in January 2015, in London and Chicago. In February and March, they played four full-length sets at the Australian music festival Soundwave for the first time, with additional headlining sideshows in Sydney and Brisbane. They also performed at the Soundwave spin-off Westfest in New Zealand. Next was a headlining performance in a stadium at RodeoHouston on March 8. They are on the bill for the Pot of Gold festival in Tempe and are headlining three Punkspring festival dates with Rancid in Japan in late March 2015. On January 14, 2015, a 7-date October UK tour was announced and shortly expanded to 8 dates. On January 15, a co-headlining 39-date Boys of Zummer tour with rapper Wiz Khalifa was announced for a North America leg from June to August. A nine date European tour was announced to visit six countries in October 2015. Fall Out Boy headlined SunFest on May 3.

== Setlist ==
1. "Sugar, We're Goin Down"
2. "Irresistible"
3. "The Phoenix"
4. "A Little Less Sixteen Candles, a Little More "Touch Me""
5. "I Slept with Someone in Fall Out Boy and All I Got Was This Stupid Song Written About Me"
6. "Thriller"
7. "The Kids Aren't Alright"
8. "This Ain't a Scene, It's an Arms Race"
9. "Immortals"
10. "Young Volcanoes"
11. "Dance, Dance"
12. "American Beauty/American Psycho"
13. "Jet Pack Blues"
14. "Grand Theft Autumn/Where Is Your Boy"
15. "Uma Thurman"
16. "Thnks Fr Th Mmrs"
17. "I Don't Care"
18. "Centuries"
  Encore
19. "My Songs Know What You Did in the Dark (Light Em Up)"
20. "Saturday"

== Opening acts ==
- Wiz Khalifa
- Hoodie Allen
- Professor Green (Europe) (select dates)
- Matt and Kim (Europe) (select dates)
- Lil Uzi Vert (North America) (select dates)

== Tour dates ==
List of 2015 concerts, showing date, city, country, venue, opening act, tickets sold, number of available tickets, and gross revenue
Date	City	Country	Venue	Opening act(s)	Attendance	Revenue
May 3, 2015	West Palm Beach	United States	SunFest	—N/a	—N/a	—N/a
May 23, 2015 (Note: The May 24, 2015 concert in Norwich at Earlham Park is part of Radio 1's Big Weekend 2015.)	Norwich	England	Earlham Park	—N/a	—N/a	—N/a
June 10, 2015	Camden	United States	Susquehanna Bank Center	Hoodie Allen	—N/a	—N/a
June 13, 2015	Holmdel	United States	PNC Bank Arts Center	Hoodie Allen	—N/a	—N/a
June 14, 2015	Mansfield	United States	Xfinity Center	Hoodie Allen	—N/a	—N/a
June 16, 2015	Cuyahoga Falls	United States	Blossom Music Center	Hoodie Allen	—N/a	—N/a
June 17, 2015	Toronto	Canada	Molson Canadian Amphitheatre	Hoodie Allen	—N/a	—N/a
June 18, 2015	Darien Center	United States	Darien Lake Performing Arts Center	Hoodie Allen	—N/a	—N/a
June 20, 2015	Bangor	United States	Darling's Waterfront Pavilion	Hoodie Allen	—N/a	—N/a
June 23, 2015	Saratoga Springs	United States	Saratoga Performing Arts Center	Hoodie Allen	—N/a	—N/a
June 24, 2015	Wantagh	United States	Nikon at Jones Beach Theater	Hoodie Allen	—N/a	—N/a
June 26, 2015	Hartford	United States	Xfinity Theatre	Hoodie Allen	—N/a	—N/a
June 27, 2015	Columbia	United States	Merriweather Post Pavilion	Hoodie Allen	—N/a	—N/a
June 28, 2015	Virginia Beach	United States	Farm Bureau Live	Hoodie Allen	—N/a	—N/a
June 30, 2015	Cincinnati	United States	Riverbend Music Center	Hoodie Allen	—N/a	—N/a
July 1, 2015	Noblesville	United States	Klipsch Music Center	Hoodie Allen	—N/a	—N/a
July 2, 2015	Burgettstown	United States	First Niagara Pavilion	Hoodie Allen	—N/a	—N/a
July 3, 2015	Hershey	United States	Giant Center	Hoodie Allen	—N/a	—N/a
July 4, 2015	Scranton	United States	Toyota Pavilion at Montage Mountain	Hoodie Allen	—N/a	—N/a
July 10, 2015	Clarkston	United States	DTE Energy Music Theatre	Hoodie Allen	14,637 / 14,637	$497,359
July 11, 2015	Tinley Park	United States	Hollywood Casino Amphitheatre	Hoodie Allen	—N/a	—N/a
July 12, 2015	Nashville	United States	Bridgestone Arena	Hoodie Allen	11,917 / 14,374	$471,961
July 14, 2015	Maryland Heights	United States	Hollywood Casino Amphitheatre	Hoodie Allen	—N/a	—N/a
July 15, 2015	Columbus	United States	Lifestyle Communities Pavilion	Hoodie Allen	—N/a	—N/a
July 17, 2015	Atlanta	United States	Aaron's Amphitheatre	Hoodie Allen	—N/a	—N/a
July 18, 2015	Raleigh	United States	Walnut Creek Amphitheatre	Hoodie Allen	—N/a	—N/a
July 19, 2015	Charlotte	United States	PNC Music Pavilion	Hoodie Allen	—N/a	—N/a
July 21, 2015	Bonner Springs	United States	Cricket Wireless Amphitheater	Hoodie Allen	—N/a	—N/a
July 22, 2015	Tulsa	United States	BOK Center	Hoodie Allen	—N/a	—N/a
July 24, 2015	The Woodlands	United States	Cynthia Woods Mitchell Pavilion	Hoodie Allen	—N/a	—N/a
July 25, 2015	Dallas	United States	Gexa Energy Pavilion	Hoodie Allen	—N/a	—N/a
July 26, 2015	Austin	United States	Austin360 Amphitheater	Hoodie Allen	—N/a	—N/a
July 28, 2015	Albuquerque	United States	Isleta Amphitheater	Hoodie Allen	—N/a	—N/a
July 29, 2015	Greenwood Village	United States	Fiddler's Green Amphitheatre	Hoodie Allen	—N/a	—N/a
July 30, 2015	West Valley City	United States	USANA Amphitheatre	Hoodie Allen	—N/a	—N/a
August 1, 2015	Ridgefield	United States	Amphitheater Northwest	Hoodie Allen	—N/a	—N/a
August 2, 2015	Auburn	United States	White River Amphitheater	Hoodie Allen	—N/a	—N/a
August 4, 2015	Concord	United States	Concord Pavilion	Hoodie Allen	—N/a	—N/a
August 5, 2015	Sacramento	United States	Sleep Train Arena (Note: The venue of the August 5, 2015 concert in Sacramento was the Toyota Amphitheatre, which was referred to on the tickets under its former name, Sleep Train Amphitheatre. Live Nation (and the band's website) erroneously listed the venue as the Sleep Train Arena, which is a separate venue also in the Sacramento area.)	Hoodie Allen	—N/a	—N/a
August 7, 2015	Las Vegas	United States	Mandalay Bay Events Center	Hoodie Allen	—N/a	—N/a
August 8, 2015	Chula Vista	United States	Sleep Train Amphitheatre	Hoodie Allen	—N/a	—N/a
August 10, 2015	Los Angeles	United States	Hollywood Bowl	Hoodie Allen	—N/a	—N/a
October 1, 2015	Dublin	Ireland	3Arena	Professor Green; Charley Marley	—N/a	—N/a
October 3, 2015	Leeds	England	First Direct Arena	Professor Green; Matt and Kim; Charley Marley	—N/a	—N/a
October 4, 2015	Aberdeen	Scotland	GE Oil and Gas Arena	Professor Green; Matt and Kim; Charley Marley	—N/a	—N/a
October 6, 2015	Birmingham	England	Barclaycard Arena	Professor Green; Matt and Kim; Charley Marley	—N/a	—N/a
October 7, 2015	Cardiff	Wales	Motorpoint Arena Cardiff	Professor Green; Matt and Kim; Charley Marley	—N/a	—N/a
October 8, 2015	Liverpool	England	Echo Arena	Professor Green; Matt and Kim; Charley Marley	—N/a	—N/a
October 9, 2015	Manchester	England	Manchester Arena	Professor Green; Matt and Kim; Charley Marley	14,696 / 15,618	$664,071
October 10, 2015	Bournemouth	England	Bournemouth International Centre	Professor Green; Matt and Kim; Charley Marley	—N/a	—N/a
October 11, 2015	London	England	The SSE Arena Wembley	Professor Green; Matt and Kim; Charley Marley	12,500 / 12,500	—N/a
October 12, 2015	London	England	The SSE Arena Wembley	12,500 / 12,500		—N/a
October 14, 2015	Brussels	Belgium	Forest National	—N/a	5,044 / 8,400	$178,648
October 15, 2015	Düsseldorf	Germany	Mitsubishi Electric Halle	—N/a	—N/a	—N/a
October 17, 2015	Munich	Germany	Kesselhaus	—N/a	—N/a	—N/a
October 19, 2015	Paris	France	L'Olympia Bruno Coquatrix	—N/a	—N/a	—N/a
October 20, 2015	Amsterdam	Netherlands	Heineken Music Hall	—N/a	—N/a	—N/a
October 21, 2015	Berlin	Germany	Columbiahalle	—N/a	—N/a	—N/a
October 24, 2015	Moscow	Russia	Stadium Live	—N/a	—N/a	—N/a
October 25, 2015	Saint Petersburg	Russia	New Arena	—N/a	—N/a	—N/a
Total					71,294 / 78,029	$1,812,039
