= Wintour is Coming =

2016 concert tour by Fall Out Boy

- Tour by Fall Out Boy
- Promotional poster
- Location: North America
- Associated album: American Beauty/American Psycho
- Start date: February 25, 2016
- End date: March 27, 2016
- No. of shows: 22

Fall Out Boy concert chronology
- American Beauty/American Psycho Tour (2015); Wintour is Coming (2016); Mania Tour (2017–18)

Wintour is Coming was a concert tour by American rock band Fall Out Boy in support of their sixth studio album, American Beauty/American Psycho. It began on February 25, 2016 in San Juan, Puerto Rico, and concluded on March 27, 2016 in San Francisco, California. The opening acts for the tour included Puerto Rican pop punk band Late Night Drive in San Juan, PVRIS and Awolnation in most of the tour dates and Finish Ticket in San Francisco. The tour played a total of twenty-three concerts over the course one month in North America, with one of them at Universal Orlando Resort's Mardi Gras 2016. A San Francisco date was announced on January 5, 2016.

== Opening acts ==
- Late Night Drive (San Juan)
- PVRIS and Awolnation (United States)
- Finish Ticket (San Francisco)

== Set list ==
This set list represents the February 25, 2016 date.

1. "Irresistible"
2. "Sugar, We're Goin Down"
3. "The Phoenix"
4. "Hum Hallelujah"
5. "Alone Together"
6. "The Take Over, the Breaks Over"
7. "The Kids Aren’t Alright"
8. "This Ain't a Scene, It's an Arms Race"
9. "Novocaine"
10. "Disloyal Order of Water Buffaloes"
11. "Save Rock and Roll"
12. "Fourth of July"
13. "Grand Theft Autumn/Where Is Your Boy"
14. "Uma Thurman"
15. "Young Volcanoes"
16. "Dance, Dance"
17. "American Beauty/American Psycho"
18. "Immortals"
19. "I Don’t Care"
20. "Beat It" (Michael Jackson cover)
21. "Thnks fr th Mmrs"
22. "Centuries"
  Encore
23. "My Songs Know What You Did in the Dark (Light Em Up)"
24. "Saturday"

== Tour dates ==
List of 2016 concerts
Date	City	Country	Venue	Opening act(s)	Attendance	Revenue
February 25, 2016	San Juan	Puerto Rico	José Miguel Agrelot Coliseum	Late Night Drive	—	—
February 26, 2016	Hollywood	United States	Hard Rock Live Arena	PVRIS; Awolnation	—	—
February 27, 2016 (Note: Part of Universal Orlando Resort's Mardi Gras 2016.)	Orlando	United States	Universal Music Plaza Stage	—	—	—
March 1, 2016	North Charleston	United States	North Charleston Coliseum	PVRIS; Awolnation	6,283 / 7,942	$298,729
March 2, 2016	Charlottesville	United States	John Paul Jones Arena	PVRIS; Awolnation	—	—
March 4, 2016	New York City	United States	Madison Square Garden	PVRIS; Awolnation	13,940 / 13,940	$726,377
March 5, 2016	Mashantucket	United States	Foxwoods Resort Casino	PVRIS; Awolnation	—	—
March 6, 2016	Syracuse	United States	Oncenter War Memorial Arena	PVRIS; Awolnation	5,140 / 5,589	$272,455
March 8, 2016	Grand Rapids	United States	Van Andel Arena	PVRIS; Awolnation	9,878 / 10,396	$430,927
March 9, 2016	Dayton	United States	Nutter Center	PVRIS; Awolnation	9,761 / 10,444	$398,588
March 10, 2016	Louisville	United States	KFC Yum! Center	PVRIS; Awolnation	—	—
March 12, 2016	Chicago	United States	United Center	PVRIS; Awolnation	12,970 / 13,378	$607,683
March 13, 2016	Saint Paul	United States	Xcel Energy Center	PVRIS; Awolnation	11,918 / 13,962	$502,581
March 14, 2016	Des Moines	United States	Wells Fargo Arena	PVRIS; Awolnation	9,727 / 10,807	$429,945
March 17, 2016	Birmingham	United States	Legacy Arena	PVRIS; Awolnation	8,611 / 8,611	$404,376
March 18, 2016	Memphis	United States	FedExForum	PVRIS; Awolnation	8,052 / 8,052	$437,508
March 19, 2016	New Orleans	United States	Smoothie King Center	PVRIS; Awolnation	9,517 / 9,517	$509,298
March 20, 2016	San Antonio	United States	Freeman Coliseum	PVRIS; Awolnation	7,059 / 7,992	$321,475
March 22, 2016	Wichita	United States	Intrust Bank Arena	PVRIS; Awolnation	8,365 / 8,575	$397,888
March 25, 2016	Phoenix	United States	Talking Stick Resort Arena	PVRIS; Awolnation	—	—
March 26, 2016	Irvine	United States	Irvine Meadows Amphitheatre	—	14,445 / 14,955	$516,037
March 27, 2016	San Francisco	United States	Bill Graham Civic Auditorium	Finish Ticket; Awolnation	7,300 / 7,300	$385,995
Total					142,966 / 151,460	$6,639,862

Cancellations

Date	City	Venue	Reason
March 23, 2016	Colorado Springs	Broadmoor World Arena	Inclement weather
