= Make America Psycho Again =

Remix album by Fall Out Boy
- Released: October 30, 2015
- Recorded: 2014–15
- Genre: Hip-hop
- Length: 41:07
- Label: Island; DCD2

Fall Out Boy chronology
American Beauty/American Psycho (2015)	Make America Psycho Again (2015)	Mania (2018)

Make America Psycho Again is the first remix album by Fall Out Boy, released on October 30, 2015. The album is a remixed version of the band's original album American Beauty/American Psycho, and features a different rapper on each song. The album drew in over 13,000 equivalent copies in the United States its debut week. The title alludes to the "Make America Great Again" campaign slogan used by then-presidential candidate Donald Trump during the 2016 election cycle. The album artwork features a red-tinted photo of the same face-painted boy from the original cover, holding a sparkler.

== Promotion ==
The album was preceded by four promotional singles; "Irresistible" featuring American hip-hop-trap trio Migos was released on October 23, 2015. "American Beauty/American Psycho" featuring American hip-hop recording artist ASAP Ferg was released on October 26, 2015. "The Kids Aren't Alright" featuring American rapper, singer and songwriter Azealia Banks was released on October 27, 2015. "Uma Thurman" featuring American rapper, songwriter and actor Wiz Khalifa was released on October 28, 2015. The "Uma Thurman" remix was previously released in January 2015 for the Boys of Zummer tour.

== Track listing ==
No.	Title	Writer(s)	Producer(s)	Length
1.	"Irresistible" (featuring Migos)	Pete Wentz; Patrick Stump; Joe Trohman; Andy Hurley; Quavious Marshall; Kirsnick Ball	Butch Walker; Jake Sinclair; Zaytoven^{[a]}	4:12
2.	"American Beauty/American Psycho" (featuring ASAP Ferg)	Wentz; Stump; Trohman; Hurley; Sebastian Akchoté-Bozovic; Nikki Sixx; Darold Brown	S.A.; Tony Fadd^{[a]}	3:38
3.	"Centuries" (featuring Juicy J)	J.R. Rotem; Wentz; Stump; Trohman; Hurley; Michael J. Fonseca; Raja Kumari; Justin Tranter; Suzanne Vega	J.R. Rotem; Omega^{[b]}	3:22
4.	"The Kids Aren't Alright" (featuring Azealia Banks)	Wentz; Stump; Trohman; Hurley; Azealia Banks; Kevin James	Sinclair; Kenneth Smith^{[a]}	4:53
5.	"Uma Thurman" (featuring Wiz Khalifa)	Wentz; Stump; Trohman; Hurley; Jake Sinclair; Waqaas Hashmi; Jarrel Young; Liam O'Donnell; Jack Marshall; Bob Mosher; Cameron Thomaz	Sinclair; Young Wolf Hatchlings^{[b]}; ID Labs^{[a]}; Badboxes^{[a]}	3:11
6.	"Jet Pack Blues" (featuring Big K.R.I.T.)	Wentz; Stump; Trohman; Hurley; Justin Scott	Sinclair; Childish Major^{[a]}	3:18
7.	"Novocaine" (featuring Uzi)	Wentz; Stump; Trohman; Hurley; Uzi	Sinclair; Casa Di^{[a]}	3:31
8.	"Fourth of July" (featuring OG Maco)	Wentz; Stump; Trohman; Hurley; Sinclair; Ryan Lott; Benedict Chiajulam Ihesiaba Jr.	Sinclair; Bobby Johnson^{[a]}	3:42
9.	"Favorite Record" (featuring ILoveMakonnen)	Wentz; Stump; Trohman; Hurley; Makonnen Sheran	Sinclair; Fadd^{[a]}	3:23
10.	"Immortals" (featuring Black Thought)	Wentz; Stump; Trohman; Hurley	Butch Walker; B Wheezy Beats^{[a]}	4:05
11.	"Twin Skeleton's (Hotel in NYC)" (featuring Joey Badass)	Wentz; Stump; Trohman; Hurley; Jo-Vaughn Scott	Sinclair; Zaytoven^{[a]}	3:52
Total length:				41:07

Japan and Spotify bonus tracks
No.	Title	Writer(s)	Producer(s)	Length
12.	"Uma Thurman" (Fall Out Boy vs. Didrick) (Extended Version)	Wentz; Stump; Trohman; Hurley; Jake Sinclair; Waqaas Hashmi; Jarrel Young; Liam O'Donnell; Jack Marshall	Sinclair	3:14
13.	"Irresistible" (featuring Demi Lovato)	Wentz; Stump; Trohman; Hurley	Butch Walker; Jake Sinclair	3:25
Total length:				47:46

Notes

- "Centuries" contains elements of "Tom's Diner" by Suzanne Vega
- ^{^[a]} signifies a remix producer
- ^{^[b]} signifies a co-producer

== Charts ==
Chart (2015)	Peak position
UK Albums (OCC)	88
US Billboard 200	107
