= Big Hero 6 =

Big Hero 6 may refer to:

- Big Hero 6 (comics), a Marvel Comics superhero team
- Big Hero 6 (film), a 2014 American animated superhero film based on the Marvel Comics team
  - Big Hero 6 (soundtrack), the soundtrack album for the 2014 film
- Big Hero 6: The Series, an American superhero animated television series based on the 2014 film
