= The Kids Are Alright =

The Kids Are Alright can refer to:

- "The Kids Are Alright" (song), a 1966 song by The Who
- The Kids Are Alright (1979 film), a documentary film about the English rock band The Who
  - The Kids Are Alright (soundtrack), the soundtrack album to the documentary
- "The Kids Are Alright", an episode of Avengers: Ultron Revolution
- "The Kids Are Alright" (Dawson's Creek), a 2002 television episode
- "The Kids Are Alright" (Supernatural), a 2007 television episode
- "The Kids Are Alright" (That '70s Show), a 2003 television episode
- "The Kids Are Alright" (Ugly Betty), a 2008 television episode
- The Kids Are Alright (album), a 2018 album by Chloe x Halle
- The Kids Are Alright (TV series), a 2018 American comedy TV series
- The Kids Are Alright (2021 film), a Spanish family comedy film

== See also ==
- The Kids Are All Right (film), a 2010 comedy-drama film
- The Kids Are All Right (game show), a British game show
- The Kids Aren't Alright (disambiguation)
- "The Kids Are Alt-right", a 2018 song by Bad Religion
- "The Kids Are All Wrong", a 1998 song by Lagwagon from Let's Talk About Feelings
- "The Kids Aren't Alright", a 1998 song by The Offspring from Americana
- “The Kids Aren’t All Right”, a 2015 song by Fall Out Boy from American Beauty/American Psycho
- “The Kids Are All Right”, a 2024 song by Ayra Starr from The Year I Turned 21
