= The Kids Aren't Alright (disambiguation) =

"The Kids Aren't Alright" is a 1999 song by the Offspring.

The Kids Aren't Alright may also refer to:

- "The Kids Aren't Alright" (Casualty), a 2012 webisode
- "The Kids Aren't All Right", a 2014 episode of Justified
- "The Kids Aren't Alright" (Fall Out Boy song), 2014
- "The Kids Aren't Alright", a song by Bryce Vine, 2023

== See also ==
- The Kids Are Alright (disambiguation)
