= Big Hero 6 (soundtrack) =

Big Hero 6 (Original Motion Picture Soundtrack)

Soundtrack album by Henry Jackman
- Released: November 4, 2014
- Recorded: 2014
- Studios: Newman Scoring Stage, 20th Century Studios
- Genre: Film score
- Length: 53:57
- Label: Universal Music Group
- Producer: Chris Montan

Henry Jackman chronology
| Captain America: The Winter Soldier (2014) | Big Hero 6 (2014) | The Interview (2014) |

Singles from Big Hero 6 (Original Motion Picture Soundtrack)
- 1. "Immortals" Released: October 14, 2014; 2. "Story (English Version)" Released: October 21, 2014

Big Hero 6 (Original Motion Picture Soundtrack) is the soundtrack album to Disney's 2014 animated superhero film Big Hero 6. The album was released by Universal Music Group digitally on November 4, 2014, and through physical formats on November 25. It featured 19 tracks, from the background score composed by Henry Jackman, and an original song titled "Immortals" written and recorded by American rock band Fall Out Boy. The track was released as a single on October 14, 2014. The score consisted of electronic and orchestral music, to balance with the film's emotional depth and heroic themes.

== Development ==
Henry Jackman was roped in to compose the score for the film, with an exclusive first look footage revealed on April 3, 2014. He saw a preview from the film, six months before the release and started to write music which ranged from a "wide palette of sounds". However, he had to write "a big, old-fashioned theme" for Big Hero 6 on piano, which took him a week to complete. Jackman recalled, "The funny thing with live-action films, these days, is that people want a reduced and minimalist score. They shy away from big themes, but the fact that this is a huge super hero film set in an animated film tradition means that you can really go for those colorful tunes [...] the important thing about having those themes is that when you let go of the electronic sections, especially towards the end of the film, you’ve got some real music hiding underneath for when it gets really dramatic."

The themes ranged from "bouncy and fun" to "emotional". He further used a 77-piece orchestra for scoring the main themes due to the emotional content, heroism, jeopardy and the musical cues being a fine-balance in the film. Jackman stated "There was something about the visual style that was so grandiose and operatic that I got to use quite a virtuoso orchestration which was nice. Disney and the directors were on board for that especially considering today’s current vogue of more post-modern and minimalist use of orchestra, it was very nice to indulge and do so in a more historical style as well."

An original song "Immortals" was composed for the film and was included in the soundtrack album. It was performed by the Fall Out Boy band and was written by the band members Patrick Stump, Pete Wentz, Joe Trohman and Andy Hurley. It was played when the Big Hero 6 team is transformed from a group of super smart individuals to a band of high-tech heroes. In addition to the digital and physical versions, a 2-disc vinyl edition was available for pre-order through Disney Music Emporium on October 23, and was marketed and released on December 16.

== Track listing ==
All music is composed by Henry Jackman, except where noted.

| No. | Title | Length |
|---|---|---|
| 1. | "Immortals" (performed by Fall Out Boy) | 3:15 |
| 2. | "Hiro Hamada" | 1:57 |
| 3. | "Nerd School" | 2:12 |
| 4. | "Microbots" | 1:46 |
| 5. | "Tadashi" | 1:46 |
| 6. | "Inflatable Friend" | 1:56 |
| 7. | "Huggable Detective" | 1:35 |
| 8. | "The Masked Man" | 1:29 |
| 9. | "One of the Family" | 1:49 |
| 10. | "Upgrades" | 2:27 |
| 11. | "The Streets of San Fransokyo" | 4:08 |
| 12. | "To the Manor Born" | 1:15 |
| 13. | "So Much More" | 3:01 |
| 14. | "First Flight" | 2:35 |
| 15. | "Silent Sparrow" | 4:39 |
| 16. | "Family Reunion" | 2:39 |
| 17. | "Big Hero 6" | 6:57 |
| 18. | "I Am Satisfied with My Care" | 5:29 |
| 19. | "Signs of Life" | 1:14 |
| 20. | "Reboot" | 1:48 |
| Total length: | | 53:57 |

Big Hero 6 (Original Motion Picture Soundtrack) – Japan Version
| No. | Title | Writer(s) | Artist | Length |
|---|---|---|---|---|
| 21. | "Story" (English Version) | Ai | Ai | 4:51 |
| Total length: | | | | 58:07 |

== Additional music ==
An instrumental section of "Eye of the Tiger" was played brief in the film, although was not included in the soundtrack. For the Japanese release of the album, a previously unreleased English version of Japanese-American singer Ai's single "Story" was released as a single by EMI Records and Walt Disney Records exclusively in Japan on October 21, 2014. The song was used in promotional videos and in the film's credits for the Japanese release. The song "Top of the World" by Greek Fire was included in the second trailer for the film.

== Reception ==
Reviewing for the score and soundtrack, Alex Reif of Laughing Palace said that Jackman's score "is uplifting and memorable and for this film, he has infused lots of digital instruments with a full orchestra and Japanese sounds". Matt DeTurck of City Newspaper stated "the album leans heavily on pop beats and electronics for the first half, giving the scenes a sense of bubbling, modern joyfulness". Filmtracks based critic noted about the use of "The entire package is well handled by Jackman, with a solid narrative and a listening experience on album that is easy-going and affable. That assumes you can handle the flashy electronic presence in parts. However, it is a winner in its genre." He added that the "style of Jackman's work is more heavily orchestral than in some of his other animated ventures, though for casual listeners, the vibrant electronic and pop influences will still seem dominant".

== Charts ==
Chart positions
| Chart (2014) | Peak position |
|---|---|
| Australian Albums (ARIA) | 82 |
| UK Official Soundtracks Chart (OCC) | 25 |
| US Billboard 200 | 103 |
| US Top Soundtracks (Billboard) | 9 |
| US Soundtrack Albums (Billboard) | 7 |
