= The Kids Aren't Alright (Fall Out Boy song) =

Promotional single by Fall Out Boy

from the album American Beauty/American Psycho
- Released: December 15, 2014
- Recorded: 2014
- Genre: Pop-punk; pop rock; emo
- Length: 4:20
- Label: Island; DCD2
- Songwriters: Pete Wentz; Patrick Stump; Joe Trohman; Andy Hurley

"The Kids Aren't Alright" is a song by American rock band Fall Out Boy. It was released as a promotional single from their sixth studio album, American Beauty/American Psycho, as a digital download with pre-orders of the album.

== Background and release ==
"The Kids Aren’t Alright" was released onto their YouTube account on December 14, 2014, and released the next day as a digital download with pre-orders of the album along with the singles "Centuries" and "American Beauty/American Psycho". It coincided with the release of the second official single from the album, "American Beauty/American Psycho", along with the album artwork and track listing. When asked which American Beauty/American Psycho track the band was most proud of, Pete Wentz responded, "It's hard to say because it's like having kids. [Patrick] says The Kids Aren't Alright". The song is the fourth song on Fall Out Boy's sixth studio album American Beauty/American Psycho, and it runs the length of four minutes and twenty seconds.

A remix of the song featuring Azealia Banks was included on the remix album Make America Psycho Again.

== Composition ==
Collin Brennan of Consequence of Sound described the song as being a "slowed-down pop gem".

== Commercial performance ==
The song debuted at No. 18 on the Billboard Bubbling Under Hot 100 Singles chart which lists the top singles that have yet to chart on the main Billboard Hot 100. It also reached No. 10 on the US Hot Rock Songs chart. Three weeks after its release, "The Kids Aren't Alright" debuted at No. 189 the UK Singles Chart week ending January 17, 2015.

== Chart performance ==
=== Peak positions ===
Chart (2014)	Peak position
UK Singles (Official Charts Company)	189
US Bubbling Under Hot 100 (Billboard)	18
US Hot Rock & Alternative Songs (Billboard)	10

=== Year-end charts ===
Chart (2015)	Position
US Billboard Hot Rock Songs	79

== Certifications ==
Region	Certification	Certified units/sales
United States (RIAA)	Gold	500,000^{‡}
^{‡} Sales+streaming figures based on certification alone.
