= PAX AM Days =

EP by Fall Out Boy
- Released: October 15, 2013
- Recorded: July 2013
- Studio: PAX AM Studios in Hollywood, Los Angeles, California
- Genre: Punk rock; hardcore punk
- Length: 13:19
- Label: Island; PAX AM
- Producer: Ryan Adams; Mike Viola

Fall Out Boy chronology
Save Rock and Roll (2013)	PAX AM Days (2013)	American Beauty/American Psycho (2015)

PAX AM Days (stylized as PAX•AM Days) is an EP by American rock band Fall Out Boy, released on October 15, 2013, by Island Records and PAX AM. It consists of hardcore punk and punk rock influenced tracks recorded during a two-day "marathon" session with producer Ryan Adams and the band in July 2013 at PAX AM Studios.

The EP was released on CD, digitally and on double 7" vinyl as a stand-alone EP, and also on a limited Save Rock and Roll PAX AM Edition (2013) double-disc reissue. The double 7" vinyl pressing was limited to 3,000, and released on November 29 as part of Record Store Day - Back to Black Friday. Each copy came with a code for a bonus song download, a cover of "New Dreams" by Naked Raygun. The code was found stamped into the dead wax of the 7". On September 30, Fall Out Boy announced the EP and its release date, as well as premiered the first digital single "Love, Sex, Death" with its accompanying video. PAX AM Days was the band's second release in 2013 after the comeback album Save Rock and Roll, and marks a return to their hardcore musical roots with aggressive guitar work, the "antithesis" to the polished Save Rock and Roll.

Adams reached out to the group at the request of Fall Out Boy's friend and collaborator Butch Walker. Bassist Pete Wentz commented "I think there’s a side of our band in our fans that would appreciate some of the noise that Ryan comes up with, and it would be great for the fans to be able to hear that – hear sort of the raw energy that happens from sessions like that." The band called it "a collection of songs we did for fun...us letting out some demons" rather than a new album. On October 7, the entire EP was released for free streaming online. The EP debuted at No. 25 on the US Billboard 200 with 11,000 first week sales.

== Background ==
After returning from a three-year hiatus in early 2013, Fall Out Boy released their fifth studio album Save Rock and Roll in April that year to commercial success and mostly positive reviews. The album featured a greater emphasis on pop music than the band's previous releases. They supported the record by promoting it with a nationwide Monumentour and performing on various TV shows. In July, Fall Out Boy visited Adams' Los Angeles studio to play punk rock; the existence and release of the EP was confirmed less than half a year after Save Rock and Roll's release. Wentz first revealed the impromptu project via an Instagram picture taken inside Adams' studio.

== Recording and production ==
PAX AM Days was recorded across two days in July 2013 at PAX AM Studios in Los Angeles. The band collaborated with Adams for the raucous and raw session, the closest thing to recorded improvisation they had done. The band came in with four or five ideas, and ended up tracking "eight or nine" songs. The room was set up the way the band practiced in guitarist Joe Trohman's parents' attic during their early days. Lead singer/guitarist Patrick Stump enjoyed the accidental nature of the two-day session: "It's analog, it's just tape; [Adams would] be rolling the tape, like 90 percent of the time, even when we weren't sure what was happening. We would rehearse a song and then be like 'Alright, let's take it!' And he's like 'We're good, we got that one!'" Trohman was similarly surprised by the impromptu tracking: "'Wow, how did I just record, like, ten songs?' And that's sort of what ended up happening; everything was off the cuff." "It was punk rock – the stuff that makes you want to kick the shit out of your bedroom at your parents' house," Wentz said. Drummer Andy Hurley recorded the drums to "Love, Sex, Death" in one take. "Love, Sex, Death"'s live debut was on the Save Rock and Roll Australian tour in Adelaide.

Professional ratings
Review scores
Source	Rating
AllMusic	3/5 stars
Consequence of Sound	4/5 stars
Punknews.org	1.5/5 stars
RedEye	3/4 stars

== Composition ==
=== Music ===
The sound of the EP has been considered punk rock and hardcore punk. Speaking of the musical direction of the studio session, Trohman said "Misfits, Black Flag, Descendents, Dag Nasty, anything real late-70s, early-80s punk and hardcore stuff was influential in the creation of the music, and I think even the lyrical content too. That was the inspiration behind the entire session—to emulate the stuff that we grew up on, and the stuff that Ryan grew up on." The first digital single, "Love, Sex, Death", was described as "a fiery slab of early-80s punk and early '90s hardcore".

== Album cover and title ==
The album cover features tennis champion John McEnroe in the midst of a racket-smashing meltdown, which Wentz felt represented the band's "rage and passion", four friends just playing loud music, at the studio session. Wentz said the band felt a connection with McEnroe and how he handled himself on the tennis court, in relation to how Fall Out Boy "don't look exactly right" in the world of pop music but "here we are to make some noise". The EP title PAX AM Days is a reference to Adams' PAX AM studio in Los Angeles. McEnroe is referenced in the lyric "Johnny Mac punk/I've got enough fire for everyone."

== Track listing ==
All songs written by Fall Out Boy.

No.	Title	Length
1.	"We Were Doomed from the Start (The King Is Dead)"	1:35
2.	"Art of Keeping Up Disappearances"	1:03
3.	"Hot to the Touch, Cold on the Inside"	1:24
4.	"Love, Sex, Death"	1:23
5.	"Eternal Summer"	1:45
6.	"Demigods"	1:50
7.	"American Made"	1:38
8.	"Caffeine Cold"	2:41
Total length:		13:19

Bonus download with 7" vinyl code

No.	Title	Length
9.	"New Dreams" (Naked Raygun cover)	1:38
Total length:		14:58

== Charts ==
Chart (2013)	Peak position
Australian ARIA Albums Chart	59
UK Albums Chart	81
US Billboard 200	25
