= American Beauty/American Psycho =

2015 studio album by Fall Out Boy

Studio album by Fall Out Boy
- Released: January 16, 2015
- Recorded: 2012–2014
- Genres: Pop-punk; pop rock; arena rock
- Length: 39:01
- Labels: Island; DCD2
- Producers: Jake Sinclair; Butch Walker; J.R. Rotem; Omega; SebastiAn; Young Wolf Hatchlings

Fall Out Boy chronology
PAX AM Days (2013)	American Beauty/American Psycho (2015)	Make America Psycho Again (2015)

Singles from American Beauty/American Psycho
- 1. "Centuries" Released: September 9, 2014; 2. "Immortals" Released: October 14, 2014; 3. "American Beauty/American Psycho" Released: December 15, 2014; 4. "Uma Thurman" Released: January 12, 2015; 5. "Irresistible" Released: February 19, 2015

American Beauty/American Psycho (sometimes abbreviated as AB/AP) is the sixth studio album by American rock band Fall Out Boy, released on January 16, 2015 through Island Records as the follow-up to the band's comeback album Save Rock and Roll (2013). The band wrote music while on tour with Paramore mid-2014 and it developed into a new album.

The album's release was preceded by the 8× Platinum top 10 lead single "Centuries", released September 9, 2014 while the album was still being completed. The album's title track was released as the second single in the UK on December 15, 2014, receiving a radio premiere a month before on November 24, 2014. American Beauty/American Psycho debuted at No. 1 on the US Billboard 200 album chart, with 218,000 album-equivalent units in its first week alone and becoming the band's third No. 1 album, later being certified gold in the UK and Canada. On March 1, 2016, the album was certified platinum in the US for 1 million units.

In support of the record, Fall Out Boy played at Soundwave in Australia, made TV appearances, and embarked on three concert tours: the American Beauty/American Psycho Tour, the North American leg of which was named The Boys of Zummer Tour and featured rapper Wiz Khalifa as co-headliner, and the Wintour is Coming tour. On October 30, a remix album entitled Make America Psycho Again was released with a different rapper on each song, which drew in over 13,000 equivalent copies in its debut week.

== Background and recording ==
Fall Out Boy began writing for their sixth studio album in the summer of 2014 while still promoting their previous release Save Rock and Roll (2013) on the Monumentour concert tour with fellow American band Paramore. Recording began soon after, with the track "Centuries" being the first of the songs to be written and recorded. By late November, all the songs were written and the album was 80% complete but still needed finishing. While making their previous album, the band was just beginning to realize that music recording methods had changed since their hiatus, but have fully embraced the changes for recording American Beauty/American Psycho. Producer Jake Sinclair made the band realize that parts recorded as demos on laptops are able to make it to the final product.

Since the release of "Centuries", the band stated that the album could be released as early as "early 2015". Regarding its sound, bassist Pete Wentz described the new material as "David versus Goliath", as Wentz stated: "[Brian Hiatt] tweeted[,] "[The] problem with modern rock is it [isn't modern,]" something [I] and we had been feeling in general. [Rock] should not be relegated to a quaint little corner of Guitar Center for dads to find. [In] reaching out to SebastiAn we wanted to make something that was a throwback instead futuristic." According to Patrick Stump, "All I can say is, some people will love it. Some people will hate it. The four of us like it a lot, so we're happy".

== Composition ==
=== Music ===
The album's sound has been described as a genre-hopping pop record, incorporating the styles of pop-punk and pop rock It has also been described as arena rock. The band felt influences from playing with different artists and expanded on boundaries further than Save Rock and Roll did. Stump's goal was to make a more stylistically cohesive album than Save Rock and Roll, "where you pick any track and it sounds like it's from the same album". He wanted an album that "understood what it was the whole time". Meanwhile, Wentz was focused on making rock music relevant to pop culture (and thus requiring radio play) that could also be played in big venues; maintaining their legacy as a "big currently relevant rock band." Wentz said, "Rock 'n' roll is this progressive idea, [with] room to be dangerous and futuristic. To think it's this idea that has to be set in stone is just, like, making it not only not dangerous but this quaint little thing. It's not what it is to me. To fence yourself into this little area and chain yourself to the doghouse has never been what I thought rock music was." Guitarist Joe Trohman said of the album, "Musically, it has hip hop grooves with guitars on it," with "more in your face guitar than Save Rock and Roll". In an industry increasingly focused on singles, Stump still regards the music album as an important form of art—"I put a ton of thought into this new record, making sure it was an experience where the running order matters and the keys and tempo and everything. It all matters to me because records still matter to me."

"Centuries" contains a sample of the song "Tom's Diner" by Suzanne Vega re-recorded by American singer Lolo for the track, which Stump described as "a tip of the hat" to, as the band wanted to "re-inject" it into pop culture. The song "American Beauty/American Psycho" samples Mötley Crüe's song "Too Fast for Love". Annie Zaleski of Alternative Press described it as a "mix of fluid grooves, punky riffs and outré pop sensibilities." The title track is Patrick Stump's favorite track from the album; he stated, "It's the right level of artistically interesting, but also just fun." The track "Uma Thurman" is named after the American actress, and samples The Munsters's theme song. Thurman heard the song and allowed the band to legally use her name. "Irresistible" is an "arena-rocking" horn-driven song about deadly love, with lyricist Pete Wentz drawing inspiration from the fatal attraction between Sex Pistols bassist Sid Vicious and Nancy Spungen. The track "Fourth of July" includes a heavy sample of the song "Lost It To Trying" by Son Lux from the 2013 album Lanterns. "Twin Skeleton's (Hotel in NYC)" contains a psychedelic bridge.

=== Lyrics ===
As the band's primary lyricist, Wentz felt that he had "more perspective" on his personal life to write more about it. "The idea behind some of the songs is addressing modern love or what's going on with my head and my life [more] than Save Rock and Roll did. I think Save Rock and Roll was a little more broader when it came to that." "Centuries" was written with the aim to inspire. Some topical issues including the 2014 Ferguson unrest are addressed. Wentz stated, "as an artist that has a platform, there's certain things that if you believe, you should say." However, he restated that Fall Out Boy is not a political band.

== Title and artwork ==
The "American Beauty" half of the album's title comes from the album by the Grateful Dead and the 1999 film. The "American Psycho" half references the book by Bret Easton Ellis and the subsequent 2000 film. The album artwork features a teenage boy (Jake Karlen) with black stars and stripes painted on half of his face, standing in front of a white house. Karlen auditioned to model for the cover; the photoshoot took place in Los Angeles. Karlen said, "They wanted to see something very dark and angry, very angry. I think I pulled it off. I think I did pretty good."

== Promotion ==
=== TV performances ===
On November 24, 2014, the band announced the album's title and release details for January 20, 2015. They next played it on The Ellen DeGeneres Show with Suzanne Vega as a special guest on October 29, 2014. The band performed "Centuries" on The Voice's season finale with contestant Matt McAndrew in December 2014. The band also performed "Centuries" at the People's Choice Awards on January 7, 2015, which Billboard called the "most memorable" performance of the night. To begin their album release week television blitz, the band played "Centuries" on the morning The Today Show and again on the late night talk show The Tonight Show Starring Jimmy Fallon on 21 January. A guest appearance on the morning talk show Live! with Kelly and Michael was televised on January 23. On January 25, the band performed at the National Hockey League All-Star Game exhibition event. A performance for troops at Luke Air Force Base as a pre-Super Bowl event was set for January 30 to air live on VH1. Fall Out Boy starred in a Pepsi TV ad which aired during the 57th Grammy Awards, performing "Uma Thurman" in record-pressing plant. Fall Out Boy performed "Centuries" and "My Songs Know What You Did in the Dark (Light Em Up)" on CBS's The Talk on March 12 and it aired in Australia on March 29. In early April the band performed "Immortals" on Japanese TV show Sukkiri!! ( スッキリ!!). Fall Out Boy will be the first inductees to the "Hall of Wood" at the 2015 MtvU Woodie Awards and will also perform. They had won the Streaming Woodie award for "Grand Theft Autumn" at the first ceremony in 2004.

=== Tours ===
The band played several shows in support of the record, such as at the Soundwave in Australia and a headlining performance in a stadium at RodeoHouston. Moreover, the band planned a world tour, consisting of more than 50 dates across North America and Europe. The American leg will be co-headlining with American rapper Wiz Khalifa under the name The Boys of Zummer. The second American leg of the tour was announced October 2015, for Wintour. It began February 25th 2016, in Puerto Rico and ended on March 27 in San Francisco, California. Wintour was co-headlined with PVRIS and AWOLNATION, with a few other special guests during different dates.

The American Beauty / American Psycho touring cycle ended August 28, 2016 at the Reading and Leeds Festival. The show had a special clip of an upcoming short film called 'Bloom'. The show was performed with pyromaniacs and acrobatics.

=== Singles ===
"Centuries" was released as the album's lead single on September 8, 2014 and peaked at No. 10 on the Billboard Hot 100 chart in its 20th week. It reached No. 13 on Mainstream Top 40 and No. 4 on Alternative Songs as a crossover success. A gladiator-style music video directed by Syndrome was later released on October 14, 2014 and features a cameo from American rapper Rick Ross.

The title track premiered on BBC Radio 1 on November 24, 2014 and released a month later on December 15, 2014 as the album's second UK single. Its music video also premiered the same day. "Uma Thurman" was released to United States modern rock radio as the album's third single week ending February 10, 2015. On January 12, it was released for digital download as the third promotional song and overall the fifth preceding American Beauty/American Psycho, and reached the top position on iTunes. "Irresistible" was released as the third UK single, and its music video was released on February 19, 2015.

=== Other songs ===
"Immortals" was released on October 14, 2014 and is featured in the 2014 Walt Disney Animation Studios film Big Hero 6. Disney asked the band to write and perform the song for the film's sequence in which the Big Hero 6 team is transformed from a group of super smart individuals to a band of high-tech heroes. An alternative version is featured on the album.

As part of a pre-order deal on iTunes, the song "The Kids Aren't Alright" was additionally released as a promotional single on December 15, 2014. The full album track listing and artwork was also revealed with the preorder. Two additional digital songs were announced for January 5 and January 12 respectively. The first, "Irresistible", immediately debuted at No. 1 on iTunes. It has been described as a "booming, brass-backed anthem."

On January 13, 2015, all the unreleased songs from the album were streamed onto the band's Vevo channel.

== Reception ==
=== Commercial performance ===
American Beauty/American Psycho debuted at No. 1 on the US Billboard 200 with 192,000 first week sales and 218,000 equivalent album units. It became Fall Out Boy's third No. 1 album and second highest sales week behind Infinity on High's 260,000 debut. 204,000 individual song sales and almost 9 million streams made up AB/AP's 26,000 non-album equivalent units. A week before the album's release, forecasters predicted that it would sell 150,000 copies in its opening week, before being upgraded to 175,000-200,000 days later due to estimates that the album would strongly reach 100,000 digital preorders at the time of release. After 1.5 days of sales, Billboard predicted that first week album sales could reach 190,000, with over 220,000 in equivalent album units. In its second week, it fell to No. 6 with 55,000 equivalent album units, a 75% decline. It dropped to No. 13 in its third week and has spent twenty-four weeks in the top 20. The album was certified Gold by the RIAA on September 18, 2015, and Platinum on February 24, 2016. As of October 2015, the album has sold 572,000 copies in the US.

In Canada, American Beauty/American Psycho also debuted at No. 1 with 14,000 first week sales, becoming the band's second Canadian No. 1 and fourth Canadian top 10. On March 24, 2015, it was certified Gold in Canada for 40,000 shipments. The album debuted at No. 4 on the Official New Zealand Music Chart. In Australia, it debuted at No. 3 behind Mark Ronson, whose Uptown Special debuted at No. 2, while Taylor Swift's 1989 reigned at No. 1. The record became the band's fourth consecutive top 10 in Australia. American Beauty/American Psycho was also in a close sales race to the top position against Mark Ronson on the UK Albums Chart and led by 1500 copies mid-week, but fell short by the end of the tracking week to debut at No. 2 with 31,497 first week sales (1883 units behind No. 1). However, it made No. 1 on the UK Albums Download Chart. On June 8, 2015, it was certified Gold by the British Phonographic Industry for 100,000 copies shipped. The album saw a No. 6 debut in Ireland.

=== Critical response ===
Professional ratings
Aggregate scores
Source	Rating
AnyDecentMusic?	6.4/10
Metacritic	72/100
Review scores
Source	Rating
AllMusic	3.5/5 stars
Alternative Press	4/5 stars
The A.V. Club	B+
Entertainment Weekly	A
The Guardian	4/5 stars
Los Angeles Times	2.5/4 stars
Paste	7.0/10
Rolling Stone	3/5 stars
Spin	6/10
USA Today	2.5/4 stars

American Beauty/American Psycho received mostly positive reviews upon its release. The aggregate review site Metacritic gave the album a 72 out of 100 based on 15 reviews. Kyle Anderson of Entertainment Weekly gave it an A, commending the band for being able to make "big-venue sing-alongs that also reward deep headphone analysis." He appreciated the tracks "Favorite Record" and "Fourth of July," stating that they are "thrillingly layered." Evan Lucy of Alternative Press gave the album 4 stars out of 5, mentioning the heavy sampling in some of the album's songs: "The more interesting aspect of American Beauty/American Psycho is the band's newfound emphasis on samples," calling the band as a whole "newly reinvented." He went on to praise Stump's vocals, Wentz's lyrics, and stated that "Fall Out Boy are currently producing some of the most interesting music of their career." Caroline Sullivan of The Guardian gave an equally positive review, awarding the album 4 stars out of 5. She praised the band's "nervy ambition" on the album and called it "one of their better releases."

Annie Zaleski of The A.V. Club also gave the album a positive review. She wrote that "American Beauty/American Psycho's playful musical vibe masks lyrics plagued by flashbulb memories of failed relationships and ill-fated romantic dalliances. Thankfully, there's no self-pity in sight on these songs, only heightened self-awareness." The Los Angeles Times was also highly positive while commenting negatively on the second half of the album. "The result, at least for the first half, is almost comically exciting, one fist-pump adrenaline rush after another...Alas, Stump and his bandmates run out of steam by the end of American Beauty/American Psycho." AllMusic was also fairly positive. "Fall Out Boy have taken great efforts to incorporate whatever was happening on the charts, an inclination that isn't quite as necessary in the great digital disassociation of the 2010s, yet this inclination does give American Beauty/American Psycho a bit of a kinetic kick." "Uma Thurman" has often been identified as the centrepiece of the album.

On the other hand, Collin Brennan of Consequence of Sound gave a more mixed review. He felt that the album lacked direction, stating that "Fall Out Boy loses its way more often than not in its latest stab at rock radio dominance." He furthermore opined that the songwriting was lacking as a result of the album's heavy use of samples. Caryn Ganz of Rolling Stone also gave a mixed review. "Joe Trohman and drummer Andy Hurley's most virtuosic playing is buried under blaring production, reducing what might be Metallica-heavy riffage into background buzz." However, the reviewer had some positive comments as well: "When everything connects – like on the single "Centuries" – FOB are a glorious nexus of Seventies glitter rock, Eighties radio pop, Nineties R&B and Aughts electro stomp." The album was ranked at number 5 in Alternative Press's "10 Essential Records of 2015" list. Cassie Whitt of Alternative Press wrote that the band pushed their fan base with "rock songs structured like hip-hop tracks". The album was ranked at number 26 on AbsolutePunk's top albums of 2015 list.

== Track listing ==
All tracks are written by Pete Wentz, Patrick Stump, Joe Trohman and Andy Hurley, except where noted.

No.	Title	Writer(s)	Producer(s)	Length
1.	"Irresistible"		Butch Walker; Jake Sinclair	3:26
2.	"American Beauty/American Psycho"	Wentz; Stump; Trohman; Hurley; Sebastian Akchoté-Bozovic; Nikki Sixx	S.A.; Sinclair^{[a]}	3:15
3.	"Centuries"	Wentz; Stump; Trohman; Hurley; Jonathan "J.R." Rotem; Michael J. Fonseca; Raja Kumari; Justin Tranter; Suzanne Vega	Rotem; Omega^{[b]}; Sinclair^{[a]}	3:48
4.	"The Kids Aren't Alright"		Sinclair	4:20
5.	"Uma Thurman"	Wentz; Stump; Trohman; Hurley; Sinclair; Waqaas Hashmi; Jarrel Young; Liam O'Donnell; Jack Marshall; Bob Mosher	Sinclair; Young Wolf Hatchlings	3:31
6.	"Jet Pack Blues"		Sinclair	2:59
7.	"Novocaine"		Sinclair	3:46
8.	"Fourth of July"	Wentz; Stump; Trohman; Hurley; Ryan Lott; Sinclair	Sinclair	3:44
9.	"Favorite Record"		Sinclair	3:23
10.	"Immortals"		Walker	3:09
11.	"Twin Skeleton's (Hotel in NYC)"		Sinclair	3:40
Total length:				39:01

Japanese deluxe edition
No.	Title	Length
12.	"Centuries" (Gazzo Remix)

Japanese deluxe edition DVD
No.	Title	Length
1.	"Centuries" (music video)
2.	"Centuries" (behind the scenes)
3.	"Centuries" (Hyperlapse music video)

Notes

- ^{^[a]} signifies an additional producer
- ^{^[b]} signifies a co-producer

Sample credits

- "American Beauty/American Psycho" contains samples of "Too Fast for Love", written by Nikki Sixx and performed by Mötley Crüe
- "Centuries" contains elements of "Tom's Diner", written and performed by Suzanne Vega
- "Uma Thurman" contains samples from "Munsters TV Theme", written by Jack Marshall and Bob Mosher
- "Fourth of July" samples "Lost It to Trying", written by Ryan Lott and performed by Son Lux

== Personnel ==
Fall Out Boy

- Andy Hurley – drums, percussion
- Pete Wentz – bass guitar
- Joe Trohman – guitar, keyboards, lap steel guitar, programming, guitar engineering
- Patrick Stump – vocals, guitar, keyboards, percussion, vocal engineering (all tracks); engineering (1, 2, 10)

Additional musicians

- Jake Sinclair – background vocals, keyboards, percussion, programming
- Lolo – additional vocals (3)
- Michael Bolger – horns (1)

Technical

- Pete Lyman – mastering
- Mark "Spike" Stent – mixing (1, 3, 5)
- Claudius Mittendorfer – mixing (2, 4, 6–9, 11)
- Jake Sinclair – mixing (10)
- Todd Stopera – engineering (1, 10)
- Samuel Kalandjian – engineering (3)
- Geoff Swan – mixing assistance (1, 3, 5)

== Charts ==
=== Weekly charts ===
Chart (2015)	Peak position
Australian Albums (ARIA)	3
Austrian Albums (Ö3 Austria)	12
Belgian Albums (Ultratop Flanders)	22
Belgian Albums (Ultratop Wallonia)	42
Canadian Albums (Billboard)	1
Danish Albums (Hitlisten)	25
Dutch Albums (Album Top 100)	40
Finnish Albums (Suomen virallinen lista)	25
French Albums (SNEP)	55
German Albums (Offizielle Top 100)	12
Irish Albums (IRMA)	6
Italian Albums (FIMI)	69
Mexican Albums (AMPROFON)	24
New Zealand Albums (RMNZ)	4
Norwegian Albums (VG-lista)	16
Scottish Albums Chart (OCC)	1
Spanish Albums (Promusicae)	89
Swedish Albums (Sverigetopplistan)	13
Swiss Albums (Schweizer Hitparade)	15
UK Albums (Official Charts)	2
UK Rock & Metal Albums (Official Charts)	1
US Billboard 200	1
US Top Alternative Albums (Billboard)	1
US Top Rock Albums (Billboard)	1

=== Year-end charts ===
Chart (2015)	Position
Australian Albums (ARIA)	64
Canadian Albums (Billboard)	44
Swedish Albums (Sverigetopplistan)	40
UK Albums (OCC)	28
US Billboard 200	15
US Digital Albums (Billboard)	17
US Top Rock Albums (Billboard)	3
Chart (2016)	Position
US Billboard 200	78
US Top Rock Albums (Billboard)	27

=== Decade-end charts ===
Chart (2010–2019)	Position
US Billboard 200	178

== Certifications ==
Certifications for American Beauty/American Psycho
Region	Certification	Certified units/sales
Canada (Music Canada)	Gold	40,000^{^}
Denmark (IFPI Danmark)	Platinum	20,000^{‡}
New Zealand (RMNZ)	Platinum	15,000^{‡}
Singapore (RIAS)	Gold	5,000^{*}
United Kingdom (BPI)	Platinum	300,000^{‡}
United States (RIAA)	3× Platinum	3,000,000^{‡}
^{*} Sales figures based on certification alone.^{^} Shipments figures based on certification alone.^{‡} Sales+streaming figures based on certification alone.

== Release history ==
On January 13, 2015, Fall Out Boy streamed the album on their website and YouTube channel after the album was leaked online fifteen days early.

The album was made available on vinyl on May 4, 2015.

Region	Date	Label	Format
Australia/Europe	January 16, 2015	Island	CD; digital download
United Kingdom	January 19, 2015	Island	CD; digital download
United States	January 20, 2015	Island	CD; digital download
