= Irresistible (Fall Out Boy song) =

2015 single by Fall Out Boy

- Remix single

Single by Fall Out Boy

from the album American Beauty/American Psycho
- Released: February 19, 2015 (original version); October 16, 2015 (remix featuring Demi Lovato)
- Recorded: 2014
- Genre: Arena rock; pop rock; pop-punk
- Length: 3:26
- Label: Island; DCD2
- Songwriters: Pete Wentz; Patrick Stump; Joe Trohman; Andy Hurley
- Producers: Butch Walker; Jake Sinclair

Fall Out Boy singles chronology
"Uma Thurman" (2015)	"Irresistible" (2015)	"Ghostbusters (I'm Not Afraid)" (2016)

Demi Lovato singles chronology
"Confident" (2015)	"Irresistible" (2015)	"Stone Cold" (2016)

Music videos
- "Irresistible" on YouTube; "Irresistible" (remix) on YouTube

"Irresistible" is a song written and recorded by the American rock band Fall Out Boy from their sixth studio album, American Beauty/American Psycho (2015). Initially released as the second promotional single from the album on January 5, 2015, it debuted at No. 77 in the US and No. 70 in the UK. In February 2015, it was released as the band's third UK single, and a music video was released on February 19.

A remix version featuring Demi Lovato, was released on October 16, 2015 (same day as her fifth studio album Confident) and peaked at No. 48 on the Billboard Hot 100. On October 30, another remix version, featuring vocals by Migos and production by Zaytoven, was included in the remixed album Make America Psycho Again.

== Background ==
The song is the first track on Fall Out Boy's sixth studio album American Beauty/American Psycho, and it runs a length of three minutes and twenty seconds. The song was written by Fall Out Boy and produced by Butch Walker and Jake Sinclair. Bassist Pete Wentz compared the mood of the song to a scene in the biopic Sid and Nancy. "When I think of "Irresistible", it brings this image to my head, whether it's fictional or real, of Sid and Nancy in an alley, garbage raining down on them in an eternal spiral of romance and poison. Sometimes it's hard not to love what can hurt us the most."

== Release and commercial performance ==
The song was released as a promotional digital download online on January 5, 2015, 15 days before the album's official US release on January 20. The day of the digital release, it reached the top of the iTunes download chart, which helped it debut and peak at No. 77 on the Billboard Hot 100 chart and No. 70 on the UK Singles Chart on the strength of digital downloads. In mid-February, it was released as a UK single, following "Centuries" and "American Beauty/American Psycho" in the region. In the issue dated October 27, 2015, "Irresistible" re-entered the Billboard Hot 100 chart at No. 98 following its release as a US single, with a remix featuring Demi Lovato. It has since reached No. 48 given the single release. The song was used by WWE for their Extreme Rules PPV event and it is also featured in the promotional spots for the miniseries Heroes Reborn.

== Critical reception ==
"Irresistible" has received positive reviews from music critics, with many commenting on the anthemic nature of the song. MTV wrote positively of the song, calling it a "frantic twist of desperation, confidence and sadism with a chugging guitar, anthemic trombones and a shout-it-at-the-top-of-your-lungs chorus. Idolator commented that the song was "stadium-rocking" and full of "horn-and-synth glory". Rolling Stone complimented the song as well, stating that it is "an arena-pop anthem about deadly love." Spin described the song as a "booming, brass-backed anthem." Music Times called the song reminiscent of "My Songs Know What You Did in the Dark (Light Em Up)".

== Music videos ==
A music video was released on February 19, 2015, to accompany the UK single release. It was directed by Scantron and Mel Soria. With the video's editing resembling that of a VHS recording with "cheesy" editing, it features the band members wearing "embarrassing" sports fashion as they challenge professional basketball players into a basketball game. The struggling band is severely defeated in the match. There are several times when the members of the band almost score, and audience members cheer for them and display signs such as "Not bad Joe" and other similar slogans. Finally, the band scores once in the end. The end of the video includes a clip of the short film Bedussey from Clandestine Industries Presents: Release the Bats, stylistically the previous layer of the VHS tape which Irresistible taped over. The music video references Patrick Stump's hand being chopped off in the video for "The Phoenix".

The remix version, featuring Demi Lovato, was directed by Brendan Walter. The video stars Doug the Pug and references their previous videos for "Centuries", "Sugar, We're Goin Down", "Dance, Dance" and "Uma Thurman", as well as the official video of "Irresistible".

A third video was released on January 5, 2016 for the version featuring Lovato. The video references the NSYNC music video for "It's Gonna Be Me" where the band members are dolls in a toy store. The Fall Out Boy dolls are rejected but form their own band. The video is directed by Wayne Isham and features cameo appearances by NSYNC members Chris Kirkpatrick and Joey Fatone.

== Track listing ==
- Digital download (remix)
1. "Irresistible" (featuring Demi Lovato) – 3:25

== Charts ==
=== Weekly charts ===
Weekly chart performance for "Irresistible"
Chart (2015–16)	Peak position
Australia (ARIA)	104
Canada Hot 100 (Billboard)	82
Canada CHR/Top 40 (Billboard)	47
Finland Airplay (Radiosoittolista)	96
Israel (Media Forest TV Airplay)	2
Scotland Singles (OCC)	35
Slovakia Singles Digital (ČNS IFPI)	94
UK Singles (OCC)	70
UK Rock & Metal (OCC)	1
US Billboard Hot 100	48
US Adult Pop Airplay (Billboard)	20
US Hot Rock & Alternative Songs (Billboard)	4
US Pop Airplay (Billboard)	23

=== Year-end charts ===
Year-end chart performance for "Irresistible"
Chart (2015)	Position
US Hot Rock & Alternative Songs (Billboard)	25

Chart (2016)	Position
US Hot Rock & Alternative Songs (Billboard)	14

== Certifications ==
Certifications for "Irresistible"
Region	Certification	Certified units/sales
Brazil (Pro-Música Brasil)	Platinum	60,000^{‡}
United Kingdom (BPI)	Gold	400,000^{‡}
United States (RIAA)	2× Platinum	2,000,000^{‡}
^{‡} Sales+streaming figures based on certification alone.

== Release history ==
Promotional single

Region	Date	Format	Label
Various	January 5, 2015	Digital download	Island; DCD2

Official single

Region	Date	Format	Label	Notes
United Kingdom	February 19, 2015	Contemporary hit radio	Island	
United States	October 16, 2015	Digital download; pop radio; alternative radio	Island; Republic	Demi Lovato remix
