= American Beauty/American Psycho (song) =

Single by Fall Out Boy

from the album American Beauty/American Psycho
- Released: December 15, 2014
- Recorded: 2014
- Genre: Pop-punk; dance-pop
- Length: 3:15
- Label: Island; DCD2
- Songwriters: Pete Wentz; Patrick Stump; Joseph Trohman; Andy Hurley; Sebastian Akchoté-Bozovic; Nikki Sixx
- Producer: SebastiAn

Fall Out Boy singles chronology
"Immortals" (2014)	"American Beauty/American Psycho" (2014)	"Uma Thurman" (2015)

Music video
- "American Beauty/American Psycho" on YouTube

"American Beauty/American Psycho" is a song by American rock band Fall Out Boy. It was released on December 15, 2014, as the second UK radio single from their sixth studio album of the same name, released in 2015. An accompanying music video was released. The song debuted at No. 15 on the US Hot Rock Songs chart. A remix of the song features vocals by ASAP Ferg which was included in the remixed album, Make America Psycho Again (2015).

== Background ==
"American Beauty/American Psycho" was written by Fall Out Boy and produced by SebastiAn. Bassist Pete Wentz commented, "It's a little bit wrong but it's the right thing for us to do. Once we got that song and a few others, it really felt like [the album] came together as a body of work." The song is vocalist and guitarist Patrick Stump's favorite track from American Beauty/American Psycho; he stated, "It's the right level of artistically interesting, but also just fun."

== Composition ==
Tom Williams of Music Feeds described the song as having a "heavier pop-punk sound", while Jake Richardson of Loudwire described the song as leaning on dance-pop.

The song samples Mötley Crüe's song "Too Fast for Love".

== Release ==
While receiving a radio premiere in the UK a month earlier, the track was officially released worldwide on the same day as the promotional single "The Kids Aren't Alright", to coincide with the release of the album pre-order, track listing and album cover. Only in the UK, it was commissioned to radio as the album's second single.

== Music video ==
The song's accompanying music video was released on the same day, featuring a ballerina and a peculiar child named Jake Karlen (who is on the cover for the album with the same title). The boy has the American flag painted on his face in black. Filmed with a gritty, shaky cinematography, the ballerina represents the "American Beauty" but is really the "American Psycho" and the boy represents the "Psycho" but is really the "Beauty". In the beginning, the boy tries to destroy a music box with a ballerina in it with a sledgehammer, but he is unable to do it. The ballerina dances for a while before a group of men appear (the men possibly representing the boy's troubles, e.g. depression, anxiety, etc.). The ballerina gracefully takes down each of the men, which hurts the boy, as the men are representing his feelings, and he eventually starts spitting up blood. In the end, the members of the band come in to remove the bodies. Before the screen fades, another boy can be seen coming to the same music box, representing a repeated cycle.

== Commercial performance ==
The song debuted at No. 147 on the UK Singles Chart, reached No. 89 in its third chart week (week ending January 24, 2015) and peaked at No. 61 the week after. It also debuted at No. 15 on the US Hot Rock Songs chart on the strength of digital downloads.

== Charts ==
Chart (2014)	Peak position
Belgium (Ultratip Flanders)	83
Japan Hot 100 (Billboard)	77
UK Singles (Official Charts Company)	61
US Hot Rock & Alternative Songs (Billboard)	15

== Certifications ==
Region	Certification	Certified units/sales
United States (RIAA)	Gold	500,000^{‡}
^{‡} Sales+streaming figures based on certification alone.
