= Immortals (song) =

Single by Fall Out Boy

from the album Big Hero 6 (Original Motion Picture Soundtrack) and American Beauty/American Psycho
- Released: October 14, 2014
- Recorded: 2012
- Genre: Pop rock; electronic rock
- Length: 3:15 (single version); 3:09 (album version)
- Label: Walt Disney; DCD2; Island
- Songwriters: Patrick Stump; Pete Wentz; Joe Trohman; Andy Hurley
- Producers: Butch Walker; Jake Sinclair

Fall Out Boy singles chronology
"Centuries" (2014)	"Immortals" (2014)	"American Beauty/American Psycho" (2014)

Music video
- "Immortals" on YouTube

"Immortals" is a song written and recorded by American rock band Fall Out Boy for the 2014 Walt Disney Animation Studios film Big Hero 6. An alternative version appears on the band's sixth studio album American Beauty/American Psycho (2015).

The "End Credits" single version was released by Walt Disney Records on October 14, 2014, as a digital download. A 7" vinyl bundled with a poster was released on December 16, 2014. As of November 6, 2023, "Immortals" was certified 4× Platinum by the Recording Industry Association of America (RIAA) for one million units sold.

== Background and composition ==
"Immortals" is composed in the key of F-sharp minor. Disney asked the band to write and perform the song for the film's sequence in which the Big Hero 6 team is transformed from a group of super smart individuals to a band of high-tech heroes. "We went over to Disney and met with the directors," bassist Pete Wentz recalled. "They explained the story to us. It was insane how much it lined up with the way our band saw the world." Wentz later stated, "Disney asked the band to come in and talk to the directors so we did that.... and we discussed the scene and what our song would attempt to do. Then we went home and wrote and sent it to them- it was a back and forth from there. It was interesting to be a part of because our song was just a small part of a bigger thing and the challenge to just be a part of the fabric. It was a really cool experience."

Vocalist Patrick Stump said that the song's title was inspired by "the idea of this kid stepping up on behalf of his brother. Your victories aren't exclusively yours, so the fact that all of these people are coming together to help him get to the finish line is really exciting." Wentz further elaborated: "They're testing out their new super suits for the first time in the scene. Some of it works—some of it doesn't. You get the sense that they're stepping into a bigger role. The story's in the DNA of Fall Out Boy. It is an authentic story and it's who our band is—we've always identified with the underdog."

On December 15, when the band's upcoming American Beauty/American Psycho (2015) album was made available for preorder, "Immortals" was revealed to also be included as track 10. On January 12, 2015, the six yet-unreleased songs from the album, including "Immortals" were made available for streaming on YouTube. The band quipped, "according to Baymax this is his favorite song on the record". The album version and film versions slightly differ: on the film version the percussion "is all marching-band strident, but on the album version much of that power is stripped away."

A remix featuring Black Thought of The Roots appeared on the remixed album Make America Psycho Again.

== International versions ==
The Italian version was performed by Patrick Stump, even though he did not speak the language. Rick Dempsey, senior vice president of Disney Character Voices International, said, "he’d sing every phrase again and again and just change the pronunciation just a little bit until the person listening—who spoke fluent Italian—said, ‘That’s it!’". The Spanish version was performed by Spanish girl group Sweet California, titled "Inmortales".

== Music video ==
A music video was released with the song, depicting the four members of the band walking up to a jukebox and choosing to play the single. The vinyl record playing the song is white and depicts the face of Baymax from Big Hero 6. The concept of the music video is similar to that of Green Day's "X-Kid".

A second music video for the band's album version of "Immortals" was released on December 24, 2014, composed of scenes taken from Big Hero 6 intertwined with Fall Out Boy performing live. It was released on the 10th day of "12 Days of FOB", an event during which the band posted exclusive videos, pictures or lyrics.

== Appearances ==
A snippet of the song first appeared unannounced in a teaser trailer for Big Hero 6.

Fall Out Boy performed "Immortals" live for the first time on Jimmy Kimmel Live!. Stump accidentally sang a different version of the song on that performance. It was also performed on Japanese TV.

It was being used as a promo for the 2015–16 NFL Thursday Night Games on CBS and NFL Network.

ESPN used "Immortals" for their coverage of the 2023 NHL All-Star Game, beginning with the Skills Competition on February 3, followed by the game the next day on ABC. ESPN later integrated the instrumental parts into their coverage for the rest of the season.

== Commercial reception ==
During the week ending November 29, 2014, "Immortals" sold 25,000 downloads and peaked at No. 9 on the US Billboard Hot Rock Songs and No. 1 on the US Bubbling Under Hot 100. In American Beauty/American Psycho's release week, "Immortals" debuted on the Billboard Hot 100 at No. 96. In the week ending March 14, the song re-entered the chart at No. 78 for its second chart week, following Big Hero 6's Academy Award win for Best Animated Feature. It peaked at No. 72 the week after. To date, the song has been certified Platinum denoting one million units.

The song debuted at No. 122 on the UK Singles Chart during the week of October 25, 2014. In American Beauty/American Psycho's third chart week, "Immortals" peaked at No. 84, its fourth chart week (week of February 14, 2015). It notched one week in Australia at No. 82 in mid-January.

== Chart performance ==
=== Weekly charts ===
Weekly chart performance for "Immortals"
Chart (2014–15)	Peak position
Australia (ARIA)	82
Canada Hot 100 (Billboard)	71
Japan Hot 100 (Billboard)	94
Scottish Singles Sales (Official Charts)	60
UK Singles (Official Charts)	84
UK Rock & Metal (Official Charts)	1
US Billboard Hot 100	72
US Hot Rock & Alternative Songs (Billboard)	6

=== Year-end charts ===
2015 year-end chart performance for "Immortals"
Chart (2015)	Position
US Billboard Hot Rock Songs	16
US Billboard Rock Digital Songs	10
US Billboard Rock Streaming Songs	14

== Certifications ==
Certifications for "Immortals"
Region	Certification	Certified units/sales
Brazil (Pro-Música Brasil)	Gold	30,000^{‡}
Denmark (IFPI Danmark)	Gold	45,000^{‡}
New Zealand (RMNZ)	Platinum	30,000^{‡}
United Kingdom (BPI)	Platinum	600,000^{‡}
United States (RIAA)	5× Platinum	5,000,000^{‡}
^{‡} Sales+streaming figures based on certification alone.
