= Uma Thurman (song) =

2015 song by Fall Out Boy

Single by Fall Out Boy

from the album American Beauty/American Psycho
- Released: January 12, 2015
- Recorded: 2014
- Genre: Pop rock; surf rock
- Length: 3:31
- Label: Island; DCD2
- Songwriters: Patrick Stump; Pete Wentz; Joe Trohman; Andy Hurley; Liam O'Donnell; Jarrel Young; Waqaas Hashmi; Jake Sinclair; Bob Mosher; Jack Marshall
- Producers: Jake Sinclair; Young Wolf Hatchlings

Fall Out Boy singles chronology
"American Beauty/American Psycho" (2014)	"Uma Thurman" (2015)	"Irresistible" (2015)

Music video
- "Uma Thurman" on YouTube

"Uma Thurman" is a song by American rock band Fall Out Boy, released digitally on January 12, 2015. The song prominently features sampled theme music from the television series The Munsters (1964–66) and lyrics celebrating the actress Uma Thurman, famous for films such as Pulp Fiction and Kill Bill.

The song was the fifth digital track released in build up to the band's 2015 album, American Beauty/American Psycho. The song was released to modern rock radio as the album's third single (second in the U.S.) in early February. On March 31, 2015, "Uma Thurman" was released as the album's second U.S. Top 40 single. The remix entitled "The Boys of Zummer Remix" was released in promotion of the Boys of Zummer tour featuring American rapper and tourmate Wiz Khalifa.

The song debuted at No. 1 on the U.S. iTunes chart on its digital release, reached No. 22 on the Billboard Hot 100 and was certified 2× Platinum by the RIAA in December 2015. The music video won the 2015 MTV Video Music Award for Best Rock Video. Fall Out Boy performed "Uma Thurman" in a television ad for Pepsi — which premiered during the 57th Grammy Awards. Fall Out Boy has also performed the song on TV shows including Late Night with Seth Meyers and at the 2015 Much Music Video Awards.

== Composition and response from Uma Thurman ==
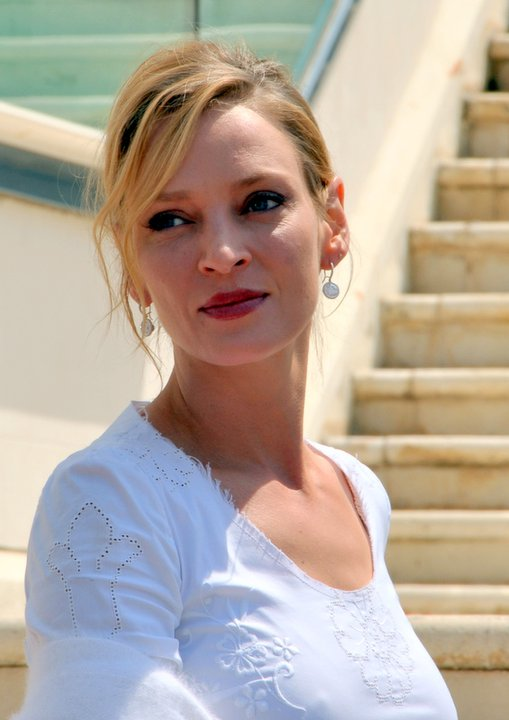
Uma Thurman, the inspiration for the song

The song prominently samples the theme music from The Munsters, taking an electric guitar riff and baritone sax line. Its title is a reference to American actress Uma Thurman's character Mia Wallace dancing with John Travolta's character Vincent Vega in an iconic scene of the film Pulp Fiction. Thurman, a fan of the band, gave permission for them to use her name. "I'm so flattered, it's so nice," Thurman said. "It's incredibly chivalrous; no one ever asks permission for anything anymore, you don't even expect it." The track incorporates "jittery piano chords" and "clapping drums", along with bursts of verbiage like "I can move mountains, I can work a miracle". Bassist and lyricist Pete Wentz has stated:

This was a fun song to write. originally, when we came up with the idea, and there was this sample in it, which is a sample from The Munsters TV show, people kept saying "oh cool, like Quentin Tarantino, cool" when we played it. We decided why don't we kind of create this world around that? To me, Uma Thurman and Winona Ryder, they were these women in pop culture who were quirky, but that made me only crush on them harder. and rather than going with the traditional Uma Thurman role, we thought a lot about Kill Bill and who her character was in that, and this kind of resilience and this violence, but there's something that's authentic about it (like a woman taking revenge or being empowered). so that's what the chorus of the song's about, and the verses are what you would do to try and capture this woman's affection.

The song is in E minor, at a fast tempo of 144–152 beats per minute. The song has been described by critics as being pop rock and surf rock.

== Critical reception ==
The song has received critical acclaim, with praise for the sample of the theme music from The Munsters and Patrick Stump's vocal performance. Billboard called it the "best yet" from the new album. Music Times wrote positively about the song, stating that the rhythm and bassline are "what really shine" and that the "steady and funky bassline carries the melody seamlessly through the track." It also felt that vocalist Stump's vocal melody played off the music well. Idolator wrote that The Munsters sample added a 1960s surf-rock vibe to the "impossibly catchy" song.

== Commercial performance ==
As a promotional digital release, "Uma Thurman" debuted at No. 73 on the Billboard Hot 100 and No. 6 on the Rock Songs chart on the strength of 46,000 first week downloads as reported by Billboard. It became the band's ninth top 15 Hot Rock Songs charting in the US since the chart began in 2009. It peaked at No. 22 as an official single (and ninth top 30 single), with a top 10 Pop Songs and top 30 Alternative Songs position. "Uma Thurman" charted in the UK reaching No. 71 and in Canada, reaching No. 67. On August 10, 2015, "Uma Thurman" was certified Platinum by the RIAA. As of September 2015, the song has sold 1,040,000 downloads in the United States. It also became Fall Out Boy's first top 10 Radio Songs hit. As of November 2023, the song has been certified 3× Platinum by the RIAA.

== Music video ==
The video premiered on VEVO on April 17, 2015. Its premise is contest winner "Sarah" (played by Sarah Murphree) spending the day doing chores for the separate band members as well as pranking them by joyriding and speeding in Trohman's McLaren given the keys by Wentz. Sarah mostly spends the day with Wentz doing some shopping, wearing bandanas in a gang-esque stickup, riding a dune buggy, playing paintball, flying in a windtunnel and crushing a pickup truck with a M1 Abrams tank with "UMA" painted twice. The truck has printed on the door "Article 1 Section 36.03". This likely refers to Alabama's Supreme Court blocking same-sex marriage. Sarah also does karaoke with Stump and does a workout with Hurley. The video, like "Irresistible", references Stump's hands being chopped off once again. The video includes cameos by Big Sean, Action Bronson, Brendon Urie, Big Data and MAX.

== Track listing ==
- Digital download (Deluxe single)
1. "Uma Thurman" – 3:31
2. "Uma Thurman (music video)" – 4:08

== Charts ==
=== Weekly charts ===
Chart (2015–2016)	Peak position
Canada Hot 100 (Billboard)	69
Canada AC (Billboard)	39
Canada CHR/Top 40 (Billboard)	47
Canada Hot AC (Billboard)	35
Canada Rock (Billboard)	50
Czech Republic Airplay (ČNS IFPI)	34
Hungary (Stream Top 40)	21
Scottish Singles Sales (Official Charts)	35
Slovakia Airplay (ČNS IFPI)	23
Sweden Heatseeker (Sverigetopplistan)	13
UK Singles (Official Charts)	71
UK Rock & Metal (Official Charts)	1
US Billboard Hot 100	22
US Adult Contemporary (Billboard)	21
US Adult Pop Airplay (Billboard)	3
US Dance Airplay (Billboard)	28
US Hot Rock & Alternative Songs (Billboard)	2
US Pop Airplay (Billboard)	7
US Rock & Alternative Airplay (Billboard)	30

=== Year-end charts ===
Chart (2015)	Position
US Billboard Hot 100	60
US Adult Top 40 (Billboard)	17
US Mainstream Top 40 (Billboard)	37
US Hot Rock Songs (Billboard)	4

Chart (2016)	Position
US Hot Rock Songs (Billboard)	34

=== Decade-end charts ===
Chart (2010–2019)	Position
US Hot Rock Songs (Billboard)	44

== Certifications ==
Certifications for "Uma Thurman"
Region	Certification	Certified units/sales
New Zealand (RMNZ)	Gold	15,000^{‡}
United Kingdom (BPI)	Gold	400,000^{‡}
United States (RIAA)	4× Platinum	4,000,000^{‡}
^{‡} Sales+streaming figures based on certification alone.

== Release history ==
Region	Date	Format	Label
Worldwide	January 12, 2015	Digital download	Island; DCD2
United States	February 10, 2015	Alternative radio	Island
United States	April 14, 2015	Mainstream radio	Island; Republic
