= Centuries (song) =

2014 single by Fall Out Boy

Single by Fall Out Boy

from the album American Beauty/American Psycho
- Released: September 9, 2014
- Recorded: 2013–2014
- Genre: Pop rock; alternative rock; arena rock
- Length: 3:48
- Label: Island; DCD2
- Songwriters: Michael Fonseca; Raja Kumari; Jonathan Rotem; Justin Tranter; Andy Hurley; Patrick Stump; Joe Trohman; Suzanne Vega; Pete Wentz
- Producers: J. R. Rotem; Omega

Fall Out Boy singles chronology
"Young Volcanoes" (2013)	"Centuries" (2014)	"Immortals" (2014)

Music video
- "Centuries" on YouTube

"Centuries" is a song by American rock band Fall Out Boy, released September 9, 2014 as the lead single from their sixth studio album, American Beauty/American Psycho (2015). Co-written by Fall Out Boy members and producers J. R. Rotem and Omega, the single reached number 10 on the US Billboard Hot 100, the band's fourth top ten hit and first in eight years, since "This Ain't a Scene, It's an Arms Race" in 2007, and was certified quadruple Platinum by the RIAA. It reached number one on the UK Rock and Metal Chart. A gladiator-themed music video was created for the song. In 2015, "Centuries" was nominated for the Kerrang! Award for Best Single. Fall Out Boy has played the song numerous times on televised performances, and it was used as ESPN's official theme song for sports coverage.

== Background ==
"Centuries" was written by Pete Wentz, Patrick Stump, Joe Trohman, Andy Hurley, J.R. Rotem, Justin Tranter, Raja Kumari and Julian Lennartz in mid-2014 and was produced by Omega and Rotem. Stump originally came forward with the song while Fall Out Boy were on the Monumentour tour with fellow American band Paramore. In an interview with Kerrang!, Wentz described the idea of the song as a "David vs. Goliath story", stating "We wanted to write a song that empowered people who are a little weird." Tranter later confirmed the song was partially inspired by Marsha P. Johnson.

The song contains part of the melody from the 1987 song "Tom's Diner" by Suzanne Vega. The segment is not a sample, but instead an interpolation as it was actually re-recorded by American singer Lolo for the track. Stump described the inclusion as "a tip of the hat" to "Tom's Diner", a song which the band wanted to "re-inject" into popular culture. Vega is credited as a co-writer for "Centuries." The song is written in the key of E minor.

== Release ==
"Centuries"
A 24-second sample of "Centuries" by Fall Out Boy, where the chorus is heard.

Days after the ending of co-headlining the Monumentour tour with Paramore, on September 4, 2014, Fall Out Boy released a teaser video depicting the title of the song in Morse code. "Centuries" received its worldwide premiere on BBC Radio 1 on September 8, 2014, before being released worldwide the next day. The song is featured as the second track of Now! 54 (2015). The same day as its release, the song impacted modern rock radio in the United States. It impacted contemporary hit radio in the country on September 16, and hot adult contemporary radio on October 6.

== Critical reception ==
"Centuries" has received positive reviews from music critics. MTV described the song as "The ultimate battle cry of a track". While Under the Gun described its hook as the band "Taking yet another step in their evolution from pop punk giants to bonafide pop stars."

Vidette provided a positive review, stating "'Centuries' displays a definite pop vibe and certainly does not reflect much of the band's earlier albums. Fall Out Boy seems to have produced this song with greater musing in mind than their concept album." B-Sides on Air also applauded the song, noting how it acknowledges contemporary radio trends and calling it "An infusion of electronic elements to up the ante on the band's next step in their musical journey". However, the reviewer criticized Stump's vocals as "raw" and "overdone", causing the track to lose its "charm".

== Music video ==
The official music video, which features the band members in a gladiator-style battle, and a cameo from rapper Rick Ross, was released on October 17, 2014. The video features strong Christian imagery and thematic elements, including a scene of a crucified figure, a cross in place of the "T" in the song title, the use of a sling against a "giant" (in reference to the Hebrew story of David and Goliath), and an angelic figure depicted as a human with white wings. The "giant" is portrayed by Canadian actor Jon Ambrose, and the band's gladiator doubles were Simu Liu, Ben Devries, Sebastian Deery and Paul Ebejer. "Centuries" was shot on-site at Fort Henry National Historic Site in Kingston, Ontario, Canada. Prior to the release of an official music video, Fall Out Boy released a video for "Centuries" filmed in Chicago featuring the use of the mobile app Hyperlapse on September 8, 2014.

The official video features four gladiators doomed for some unknown reason prior to entering the Colosseum in Rome for the entertainment of the crowds. They are given two lengths of rope, a cloth, and a stone by a mysterious cloaked figure. This is followed by scenes of a woman styled as the Virgin Mary opening her arms to a crowd, another woman with two lions behind her, a "Christ" figure, and a decadent emperor spreading his arms showing several women sitting at his feet. The ostensible "crowd favourite", a large, muscular man, easily defeats the four, cheered on by the crowd and their laughing emperor. In desperation, the four, having realized that they need to work together, combine their items into a sling, which is then used to slay the warrior. The video ends as another, unknown challenger enters the ring while the emperor laughs.

== Commercial performance ==
"Centuries" debuted at No. 22 on the US Billboard Hot 100 and No. 4 on Digital Songs with 133,000 first week sales. It also opened at No. 2 on Hot Rock Songs and No. 14 on Alternative Songs. "Centuries" peaked at No. 4 on Alternative Songs in December on strong airplay, the band's third highest position on that chart behind "Dance, Dance" and "Sugar, We're Goin Down". As a cross-over radio success, it reached No. 16 on mainstream Pop Songs by January 2015. In its nineteenth week on the Hot 100, it reached No. 12, selling 111,000 downloads that week, and propelling the band to No. 10 on the Artist 100. It eventually peaked at No. 10 on the Billboard Hot 100 in its 20th week (week ending February 7, 2015; the same as American Beauty/American Psycho's debut), becoming the band's first top 10 in almost eight years after "This Ain't A Scene, It's An Arms Race" peaked at No. 2 in February 2007; "Centuries" also reached a new high of No. 15 on Pop Songs. In its 21st week, it held at No. 10 on the Hot 100 and reached No. 13 on both Pop and Adult Pop with heavy airplay. It became their fourth and last top ten hit in the US.

"Centuries" has spent twelve consecutive weeks in the top 20 of the Hot 100 and twenty-two consecutive frames at No. 2 on Hot Rock Songs. It was certified 2× Platinum by the RIAA in December 2014 and was upgraded to 8× Platinum in November 2023. In Australia, the song debuted at No. 59 but rose to No. 55 in the following week. "Centuries" debuted at No. 36 on the Canadian Hot 100 and peaked at No. 26 in its fifteenth week. In the UK, "Centuries" made its appearance in the UK top 40 singles chart at No. 22, scoring the band another top 40 hit. On the singles sales format of the chart, the song reached No. 12. As of June 2015, the song has spent 21 weeks in the UK top 100 and has been certified 2× Platinum by the BPI, denoting 1,200,000 copies.

== Media usage and live performances ==
On September 10, 2014, ESPN announced "Centuries" as a promotional song for its coverage of the inaugural College Football Playoff. The song was featured across promotions for the event throughout the 2014 college football season, and during coverage of the semi-final and national championship games. In a January 2015 interview with FoxSports.com, the band apologized for ESPN's overexposure of the song; it was estimated that across its coverage of the two semi-final bowls, along with the National Championship game, that "Centuries" had been played a total of 45 times.

Fall Out Boy performed "Centuries" live for the first time on Jimmy Kimmel Live! on September 17, 2014. They next played on The Ellen DeGeneres Show with Suzanne Vega as a special guest on October 29, 2014.

"Centuries" was used by WWE as the official theme song for Friday Night SmackDown's 15th anniversary show. "Centuries" was also performed at the 2015 NHL All-Star game at Nationwide Arena, Columbus, Ohio in between periods. On April 5, 2015, the band performed "Centuries" as part of pre-game festivities at Wrigley Field in their hometown of Chicago for the opening game of the 2015 Major League Baseball season; the performance was televised by ESPN2 as part of its coverage. "Centuries" was performed at the 2015 MTV Movie Awards on April 12, 2015. "Centuries" was also used for an intro video of the 2015 Chicago White Sox season home games and Calgary Flames playoff home games.

The song has been used many times in various events and promotional material. It was used by Apple during the pre-keynote for WWDC 2015, frequently by in A-League team Adelaide United home games, featured in the 2015 video game Rock Band 4, and played in the trailer for Nickelodeon's Legends of the Hidden Temple.

On October 15, 2024, the song was added as an exclusive song on the game Just Dance VR. In February 2025, the song was added to Just Dance 2025 Edition as an exclusive in Just Dance+.

== Track listing ==
Digital download

1. "Centuries" – 3:48
2. "Centuries" (Remix) (featuring Juicy J) – 3:28

== Charts ==
=== Weekly charts ===
Weekly chart performance for "Centuries"
Chart (2014–2015)	Peak position
Australia (ARIA)	55
Austria (Ö3 Austria Top 40)	62
Belgium (Ultratip Bubbling Under Flanders)	68
Canada Hot 100 (Billboard)	26
Canada CHR/Top 40 (Billboard)	43
Canada Hot AC (Billboard)	40
Colombia (National-Report Top Rock)	4
Czech Republic Airplay (ČNS IFPI)	19
Czech Republic Singles Digital (ČNS IFPI)	13
Euro Digital Song Sales (Billboard)	15
Germany (GfK)	71
Hungary (Stream Top 40)	16
Ireland (IRMA)	59
New Zealand (Recorded Music NZ)	32
Scottish Singles Sales (Official Charts)	12
Slovakia Airplay (ČNS IFPI)	44
Slovakia Singles Digital (ČNS IFPI)	15
Sweden (Sverigetopplistan)	60
UK Singles (Official Charts)	22
UK Rock & Metal (Official Charts)	1
US Billboard Hot 100	10
US Adult Contemporary (Billboard)	26
US Adult Pop Airplay (Billboard)	9
US Pop Airplay (Billboard)	13
US Hot Rock & Alternative Songs (Billboard)	2
US Rock & Alternative Airplay (Billboard)	8

=== Year-end charts ===
Year-end chart performance for "Centuries"
Chart (2014)	Position
US Hot Rock & Alternative Songs (Billboard)	19

Chart (2015)	Position
US Billboard Hot 100	43
US Adult Top 40 (Billboard)	34
US Hot Rock & Alternative Songs (Billboard)	3
US Rock Airplay (Billboard)	33

=== Decade-end charts ===
Decade-end chart performance for "Centuries"
Chart (2010–19)	Position
US Hot Rock Songs (Billboard)	17

== Certifications ==
Certifications for "Centuries"
Region	Certification	Certified units/sales
Brazil (Pro-Música Brasil)	Diamond	250,000^{‡}
Denmark (IFPI Danmark)	Platinum	90,000^{‡}
Germany (BVMI)	Platinum	600,000^{‡}
Italy (FIMI)	Platinum	100,000^{‡}
New Zealand (RMNZ)	3× Platinum	90,000^{‡}
Spain (Promusicae)	Platinum	60,000^{‡}
Sweden (GLF)	Platinum	40,000^{‡}
United Kingdom (BPI)	2× Platinum	1,200,000^{‡}
United States (RIAA)	Diamond	10,000,000^{‡}
^{‡} Sales+streaming figures based on certification alone.

== Release history ==
Region	Date	Format	Label
United Kingdom	September 8, 2014	Contemporary hit radio	Island
United States	September 9, 2014	Modern rock radio	Island; Republic
Worldwide	September 9, 2014	Digital download	Island
United States	September 16, 2014	Contemporary hit radio	Island; Republic
United States	October 6, 2014	Hot adult contemporary radio	Island; Republic
