= Andy Hurley =

American drummer

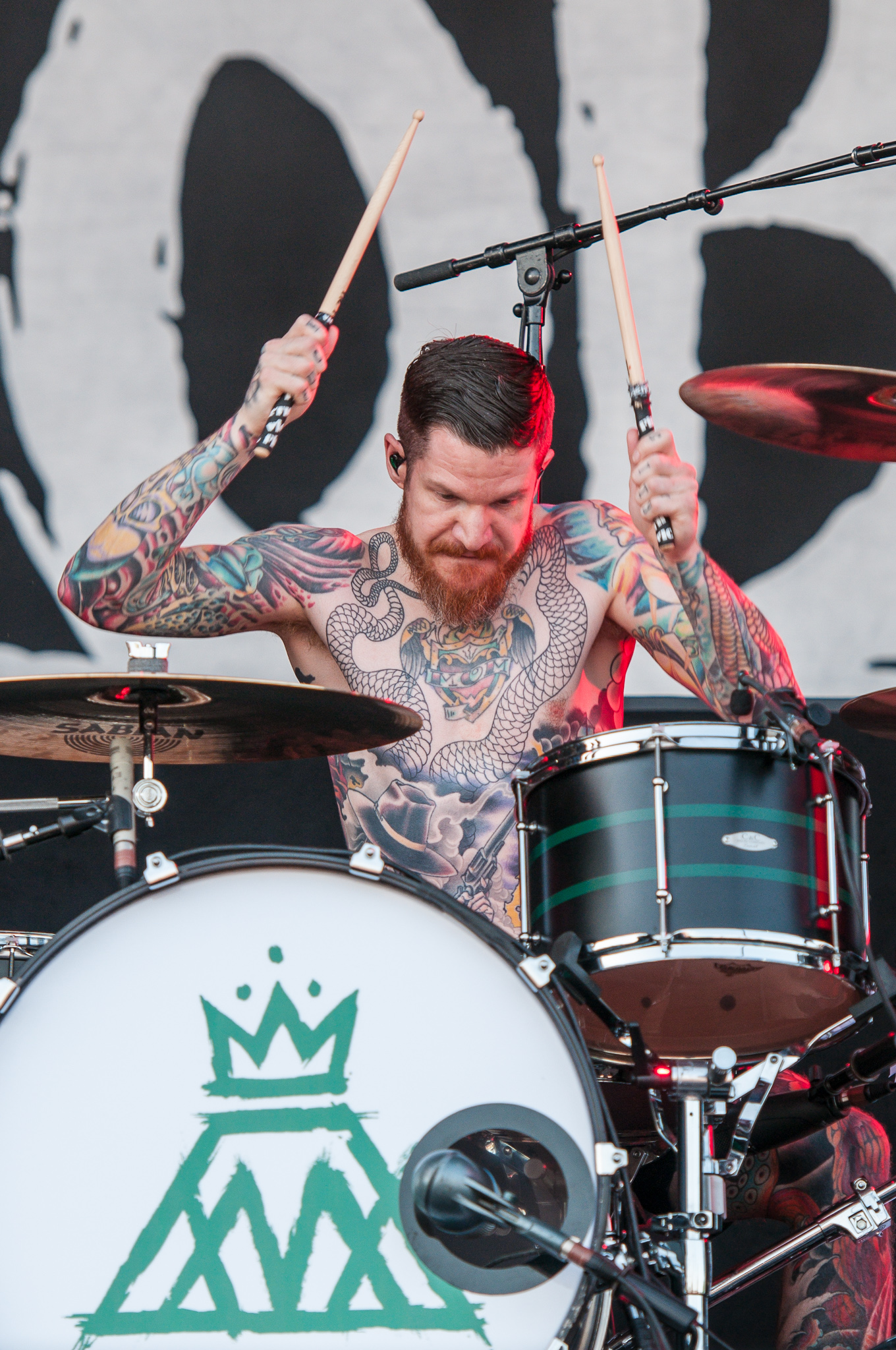
- Hurley performing with Fall Out Boy in 2014

Background information
- Born: Andrew John Hurley; May 31, 1980 (age 46)
- Origin: Menomonee Falls, Wisconsin, U.S.
- Genres: Pop-punk; hardcore punk; alternative rock; pop rock; heavy metal; metalcore; emo
- Occupation: Musician
- Instrument: Drums
- Years active: 1996–present
- Member of: Fall Out Boy; The Damned Things; Racetraitor; Burning Empires; SECT; Enabler; FocusedXMinds
- Formerly of: Arma Angelus; Project Rocket; The Kill Pill; xFor Death or Gloryx; Vegan Reich; Killtheslavemaster
- Spouse: Meredith Allen (m. 2024)

Andrew John Hurley (born May 31, 1980) is an American musician who is the drummer for the rock band Fall Out Boy. Prior to Fall Out Boy, Hurley played in several hardcore punk bands. He joined Fall Out Boy as the full-time drummer in 2003 and was in the band's lineup until its hiatus in 2009. Following that, he formed the heavy metal supergroup The Damned Things with Fall Out Boy guitarist Joe Trohman; the group went on hiatus after its debut album, Ironiclast (2010), due to band members focusing on their original bands' new album cycles. Hurley moved on to hardcore punk band Enabler which released a debut album and toured in 2012.

Fall Out Boy regrouped and announced a new album and tour in February 2013. The band's fifth studio album, Save Rock and Roll, was released in April 2013, with the EP PAX AM Days released in October of the same year. The band's sixth studio album American Beauty/American Psycho was released in January 2015 and debuted at No. 1 on the US Billboard 200.

== Early life ==
Hurley was born in Menomonee Falls, Wisconsin. He was brought up by his mother, who worked as a nurse; his father died when he was five. In middle school, his first instrument was the saxophone but in high school he switched to drums after his sister bought him the albums Ride the Lightning and Van Halen. Hurley attended Menomonee Falls High School and played percussion in bands, citing Dave Lombardo as his biggest influence when growing up and Metallica as his favorite band. Eventually, he simultaneously became interested in death metal and crossover thrash, and shortly afterward hardcore punk and metalcore bands such as Earth Crisis. After high school, he attended University of Wisconsin–Milwaukee, double-majoring in anthropology and history, while he played with three bands.

== Career ==
Hurley played in heavy metal and hardcore punk bands including Racetraitor, Killtheslavemaster, Project Rocket, xFor Death or Gloryx, The Kill Pill, and Arma Angelus. In 1999, he was a guest drummer on Vegan Reich's "Jihad" EP.

Hurley joined Fall Out Boy in 2003 after the band's debut mini-LP Fall Out Boy's Evening Out With Your Girlfriend and recorded Take This to Your Grave (2003). Hurley had been friends with bassist Pete Wentz since he was 16, and he first filled in on a touring position as drummer for Fall Out Boy before joining the band as full-time drummer. Fall Out Boy is the fourth band Hurley has been in with Wentz. With Fall Out Boy, Hurley has achieved major commercial success and toured the world.

Hurley has a record label, Fuck City, which has released music by Misery Signals, Peregrine (led by anarcho-primitivist writer Kevin Tucker), and Auryn.

During Fall Out Boy's hiatus from 2009 to 2013, Hurley was the drummer for the heavy metal band The Damned Things, which featured members of Anthrax, Fall Out Boy and Every Time I Die and released debut album Ironiclast. He has also played in the Milwaukee hardcore band Enabler, which released a full album entitled All Hail The Void in 2012.

In late 2012, Hurley began playing drums in Milwaukee-based straight edge hardcore band, FocusedXMinds. It was rumored that the return of Fall Out Boy would end his time with the band, but Hurley confirmed on Twitter on March 12 that "I am in it for life."

On February 4, 2013, Fall Out Boy unexpectedly announced their return, along with an album and single with which all four members, including Hurley, contributed. April 12 of the same year, the band released a new album entitled, Save Rock and Roll, featuring the lead single "My Songs Know What You Did in the Dark (Light Em Up)," and dates for a new tour. The band played their first show in over three years on February 4 in Chicago. 'Save Rock and Roll' peaked at No. 1 on the Billboard 200, selling 154,000 copies in its first week, becoming the band's 4th consecutive top 10 album. With Fall Out Boy, Hurley toured heavily throughout 2013 and 2014 on the album, selling out arenas worldwide with bands Paramore on the Monumentour. In October 2013, they released a new EP, PAX AM Days which they recorded in a two-day session with producer Ryan Adams.

Sixth studio album American Beauty/American Psycho was released to become the band's third Billboard 200 No. 1 album, debuting with 192,000 first week sales and 218,000 equivalent album units. The album was preceded by the triple Platinum top 10 single Centuries. Uma Thurman was released to mainstream radio on April 14, 2014, and peaked at 22 on the 'Billboard' Top 100, and were certified as Platinum in August 2015.

In 2016 Hurley started a vegan straight edge hardcore band called SECT composed of Chris Colohan (Cursed, Burning Love, Left for Dead and The Swarm) on vocals, James Chang (Catharsis, Undying) and Scott Crouse (Earth Crisis, Path of Resistance) on guitar, and Steve Hart (Day Of Suffering) on bass.

In April 2017, Fall Out Boy released Young and Menace, the lead single for the seventh studio album. The band's seventh album Mania was officially released January 19, 2018 and debuted at number one on the Billboard 200, making it the band's third consecutive and fourth chart-topping debut overall.

In 2017, Hurley guest starred, with his bandmates, in Cartoon Network's Teen Titans Go! playing himself in the first, third and fourth parts of "The Night Begins to Shine". Their cover of the title song from the special was commercially released.

In 2018, Fall Out Boy headlined Wrigley Field in the band's hometown of Chicago, marking a milestone in their career as their first headline show at a stadium.

== Personal life and views ==
Hurley is the only member of Fall Out Boy to remain straight edge. He has been vegan since he was 16. Hurley identifies himself as an anarcho-primitivist, explaining that this means he believes that humans are supposed to live the way they lived prior to 10,000 years ago. When asked about this in the February 2007 issue of Alternative Press, he said that his career contradicted his beliefs, but at the same time, he had to make a living. Hurley is a CrossFit athlete. In February 2024, Hurley married Meredith Allen in Las Vegas, Nevada.
