= 2007 in rock music =

This article summarizes the events related to rock music for the year of 2007.

== Notable events ==
=== January ===
- The self-titled album of Daughtry, the rock band formed and fronted by American Idol contestant Chris Daughtry, continues to chart following its original release in November 2006. It stays in the top of the US all-format Billboard 200 albums chart, and eventually tops the chart as well.
- British indie rock band Bloc Party releases their second studio album, A Weekend in the City. It charts in the top ten of nine separate national album charts.
- Nickelback's fifth studio album, All The Right Reasons, manages to be in the Billboard 200 top 10 despite being released back in October 2005.
- Indie rock band The Shins release their third studio album, Wincing the Night Away. It debuts at number 2 on the Billboard 200 chart, selling 118,000 copies. The debut is the highest of the band's career, and far above prior albums, which only peaked at 86 on the chart.
- Klaxons release their debut studio album Myths of the Near Future. It peaks at number 2 on the UK albums chart and was certified platinum.
- My Chemical Romance's single "Welcome to the Black Parade" breaks into the Billboard all-format US Hot 100 singles chart, peaking at number 9.

=== February ===
- Fall Out Boy releases their third studio album, Infinity on High. It debut atop of the Billboard 200 chart, selling over 200,000 copies in its opening week. It stays in the top 10 for its second and third weeks, selling another 119,000 and 79,000 copies respectively.
- At the peak of their album's popularity, Fall Out Boy's single concurrently charts high, with "This Ain't a Scene, It's an Arms Race" peaking at number 2 on the Billboard all-format Hot 100 song chart.
- Daughtry continues to have success on the charts as well, with the Daughtry album staying in the top 10, and eventually again topping, the Billboard 200 chart, while the single "It's Not Over" peaking at number 4 on the Hot 100 song chart.

=== March ===
- Modest Mouse releases the only number one album of their career, with We Were Dead Before the Ship Even Sank. It sells 129,000 copies in its opening week. The album is the only one to feature guitarist Johnny Marr, guitarist previously of The Smiths. Marr would in retrospect note that he felt Isaac Brock was a better lyricist than Morrissey.
- Good Charlotte releases their fourth studio album, Good Morning Revival. It debuts at number 7 on the Billboard 200 chart, selling 66,000 copies. This is a massive drop in sales from their prior album, The Chronicles of Life and Death, which debuted with sold three times as much in its opening week in 2004.
- Korn's live acoustic album MTV Unplugged debuts at number 9 on the Billboard 200 chart, moving 51,000 copies, a rarity for a non-studio album of a hard rock band.
- Relient K releases their fifth studio album, Five Score and Seven Years Ago. The name is an allusion to "four score and seven years ago" and the fact that the album was the first to be recorded as a five-piece. It debuts at number 6 on the Billboard 200 chart, selling 64,000 copies, a career best for the band.
- Canadian rock band Arcade Fire's album Neon Bible peaks at number 2 on the Billboard 200 chart, selling 92,000 copies.
- Fall Out Boy and Daughtry's 2007 albums continue to chart in the top 10 of the Billboard 200 chart.
- Neil Young's live acoustic performance Live at Massey Hall 1971 debuts at number 6, selling 57,000 copies.
- Nickelback's single "If Everyone Cared" peaks at 17 on the Billboard Hot 100 chart.

=== April ===
- Hellyeah, a supergroup featuring members from Pantera, Mudvayne, and Nothingface, release their debut, self-titled album. It debuts at number 9 on the Billboard 200, selling 45,000 copies.
- Bright Eyes releases their eighth studio album, Cassadaga. It debuts at number 4 on the Billboard 200, the highest placement of their career to-date.
- Nine Inch Nails releases their fifth studio album, Year Zero. It debuts at number 2 on the Billboard 200 chart, selling 187,000 copies in its opening week. It holds on to the number 3 spot in its second week as well, selling another 58,000 copies.
- Linkin Park's "What I've Done", despite it being the first single to be a departure from the band's established nu metal sound, the alternative rock song ends up being the band's third highest-charting song of their career on the Billboard Hot 100 chart, peaking at number 7.
- Pop punk band Red Jumpsuit Apparatus has the highest-charting song of their career, with "Face Down" reaching 24 on the Billboard Hot 100 chart. It is their first of only two songs that ever chart there.

=== May ===
- Manic Street Preachers release their eighth studio album, Send Away the Tigers. It peaks at number 2 on the UK albums chart, and was later certified gold.
- Linkin Park releases their third studio album, Minutes to Midnight. It debuts at number one on the Billboard 200 chart, selling 623,000 copies in its opening week. This make it the best-selling debut of the year as of that point, and only one of only 6 albums in a 2 year period to debut with over 600,000 copies sold in its first week. The album holds on to the runner up spot in its second week, selling almost another 200,000 copies, but being bumped from the top spot by Maroon 5's It Won't Be Soon Before Long. It holds on to the third place spot in its third week, selling another 100,000 copies.
- The Used releases their third studio album, Lies for the Liars. It debuts at number 5 on the Billboard 200, selling 92,000 copies. To date, the album has the band's highest charting position on the chart, though their prior album, In Love and Death, sold slightly more with 93,000 copies in its opening week.
- Daughtry's self-titled continues to chart in the top 10 of the Billboard 200 album chart.
- Rush releases their eighteenth studio album, Snakes & Arrows. It debuts at number 3 on the Billboard 200 chart, selling 93,000 copies. Only their 1993 album Counterparts debuted higher, at number 2.
- Papa Roach's single "Forever" peaks at number 55 on the Billboard Hot 100 chart, the second highest-charting song of their career to date.
- Green Day's cover of John Lennon's song "Working Class Hero" peaks at number 53 on the Billboard Hot 100 chart.

=== June ===
- The Traveling Wilburys - a rock supergroup consisting of members Tom Petty, Bob Dylan, George Harrison, Jeff Lynne and Roy Orbison - release a box set compilation album of their two studio albums and some unreleased songs, titled The Traveling Wilburys Collection. Despite being released over 15 years after the band disbanded, the release tops seven national album charts, including the UK and Australian charts, and debuts in the top 10 in the US.
- The White Stripes release their sixth and to-date final studio album, Icky Thump. It debuts at number 2 on the Billboard 200, selling 223,000 copies in its first week. The album is the highest debut of any of their albums.
- Linkin Park's Minutes to Midnight stays in the Billboard 200 top 10 for the month. One of the album's heaviest tracks, "Given Up", cracks into the Billboard 100 at 99.
- After breaking up in 2001, the Smashing Pumpkins comeback single after reforming in 2007, "Tarantula", peaks at number 54 on the Billboard Hot 100 chart. It is the band's last single to ever crack into the chart. The song "Doomsday Clock" breaks through the following month, but it is not a single.
- Daughtry's single "Home" peaks at number 5 on the Billboard Hot 100 chart.

=== July ===
- The Smashing Pumpkins release their first album since breaking up in 2001, Zeitgeist. The song debuts at number two on the Billboard 200 chart, selling 145,000 copies in its opening week.
- Korn's untitled eighth studio album debuts at number 2 on the Billboard 200 chart, selling 123,000 copies. It is their highest-charting album since 2002's Untouchables.
- Velvet Revolver releases their second and final album, Libertad. It debuts at number 5 on the Billboard 200 chart, selling 92,000 copies. This is a substantial drop from their debut album, Contraband in 2004, which sold 256,000 copies. The following year, frontman Scott Weiland departed from the band, who to date, have not succeeded in finding a permanent replacement singer.
- Fall Out Boy single "Thnks Fr Th Mmrs" peaks at number 11 on the Billboard Hot 100 chart.
- Plain White T's single "Hey There Delilah" peaks at number 1 on the Billboard Hot 100 chart, and stays there for 2 consecutive weeks.

=== August ===
- My Chemical Romance single "Teenagers" peaks at number 67 on the Billboard 200 chart.

=== September ===
- The Foo Fighters release their sixth studio album, Echoes, Silence, Patience & Grace. It tops the national charts of Australia, Canada, New Zealand, and the United Kingdom, and peaks and number 3 in the US.
- Nickelback's single "Rockstar" peaks at number 6 on then Billboard 200 chart.

=== October ===
- The Eagles release their seventh studio album, their first one in over 25 years, Long Road Out of Eden. The albums tops the Billboard 200 chart and sells 710,000 copies in its first week, the second highest debut for an album in 2007.
- Matchbox 20 release their compilation album Exile on Mainstream. The release is a two disc set; the first being a newly recorded EP of seven songs, and the second consisting of remastered versions of their greatest hits. It peaks at number 3 on the Billboard 200 chart, selling 131,000. One of the singles, a new song entitled "How Far We've Come", peaks at number 11 on the Billboard Hot 100 around the same time.
- Coheed and Cambria release their fourth studio album, Good Apollo, I'm Burning Star IV, Volume Two: No World for Tomorrow, part of their ongoing collection of concept albums. The album debuts at number 6 on the Billboard 200 chart, selling 62,000 copies.
- Foo Fighters single The Pretender" peaks at number 37 on the Billboard Hot 100 chart.
- Linkin Park single "Bleed It Out" peaks at number 52 on the Billboard Hot 100 chart.
- Radiohead release their seventh studio album In Rainbows. In Rainbows was released on their website without prior publicity and the band allowed fans to set their own price, the first such release by a major act. The album received critical acclaim and would later top both the UK albums chart and the Billboard 200.

=== November ===
- Richard Patrick reforms Filter after being on hiatus since 2002 due to entering rehab and then starting up Army of Anyone with the DeLeo brothers from Stone Temple Pilots.

=== December ===
- Led Zeppelin reforms to play their first live show in 27 years, for a tribute show for Atlantic Records founder Ahmet Ertegun, who first helped the band break into the mainstream in the 1960s. The band had only played twice since their breakup in 1980, neither of which were seen as successes. The December show goes well, and inspires some band members to continue on in some capacity. However, frontman Robert Plant is more interested in his solo career and refuses to move forward. In coming years, the remaining band members audition with other singers such as Aerosmith's Steven Tyler and Alterbridge's Myles Kennedy, but efforts eventually fizzle out to nothing.
- Daughtry's single "Over You" pearks at number 18 on the Billboard Hot 100 chart.
- Fall Out Boy final single from Infinity on High, "I'm Like a Lawyer with the Way I'm Always Trying to Get You Off (Me & You)" peaks at 68 on the Billboard Hot 100 chart.

=== Year end ===
- Daughtry's album Daughtry is not only the best selling rock album of 2007, but is the best selling album overall in the US.
- Papa Roach's "Forever" is the number one rock song at US rock radio.

== Deaths ==
- Folk rock solo musician Dan Fogelberg.

== Band breakups ==
- Audioslave disbands after Chris Cornell leaves due to difference with the rest of the band.
- Army of Anyone
- Australian band The Distillers
- Matchbook Romance
