= Live in Phoenix =

Live album by Fall Out Boy
- Released: April 1, 2008
- Recorded: June 22, 2007; Phoenix, Arizona
- Genre: Pop-punk; pop rock; emo pop; emo
- Label: Island
- Producer: Fall Out Boy

Fall Out Boy chronology
Leaked in London (2007)	Live in Phoenix (2008)	CitizensFOB Mixtape: Welcome to the New Administration (2008)

Singles from Live in Phoenix
- 1. "Beat It" Released: March 25, 2008

Professional ratings
Review scores
Source	Rating
AllMusic	2.5/5 stars
NME	6/10 stars
Rolling Stone	3/5 stars

Live in Phoenix is the first live album by American rock band Fall Out Boy. It was released on April 1, 2008 in the United States by Island Records, available as a CD/DVD set or CD and DVD separately. The CD is a live recording of the band's 2007 Honda Civic Tour, recorded on June 22, 2007 at Phoenix's Desert Sky Pavilion. The DVD features the entire live performance, most of Fall Out Boy's music videos to date (with the exceptions being the three from their Take This to Your Grave album and their 2008 cover of Michael Jackson's "Beat It" which was released as a single from this album), a wealth of behind-the-scenes footage, and a making-of segment for the "I'm Like a Lawyer with the Way I'm Always Trying to Get You Off (Me & You)" video, which was filmed in Uganda. Beyond the band's own hits ("Sugar, We're Goin Down", "Thnks fr th Mmrs", "This Ain't a Scene, It's an Arms Race"), a wide array of covers are included, such as Akon's "Don't Matter", Timbaland's "One and Only" and fellow labelmate Panic! at the Disco's "I Write Sins Not Tragedies".

"Before watching ourselves on film we never really realized how much we swear", bassist Pete Wentz wrote on the band's blog, by way of explaining the strange title for the release. "It's pretty gross ... though it's edited as to not hurt your little munchkin ears. And as for how to say the name, well any little four letter word will work." The two-disc package debuted at number 1 on the Billboard's Music Video Sales chart. The CD was certified Platinum in the US by the Recording Industry Association of America (RIAA) on December 8, 2008 for 1,000,000 shipments.

== Track listing ==
=== CD ===
No.	Title	Writer(s)	Length
1.	"Thriller"		5:04
2.	"Grand Theft Autumn/Where Is Your Boy"		3:15
3.	"Sugar, We're Goin Down"		3:37
4.	"Our Lawyer Made Us Change the Name of This Song So We Wouldn't Get Sued"		3:01
5.	"Hum Hallelujah"		3:59
6.	"Tell That Mick He Just Made My List of Things to Do Today"		3:32
7.	"I'm Like a Lawyer with the Way I'm Always Trying to Get You Off (Me & You)"		3:30
8.	"A Little Less Sixteen Candles, a Little More "Touch Me""		2:49
9.	"Beat It"	Michael Jackson	3:50
10.	"Golden"		2:29
11.	"This Ain't a Scene, It's an Arms Race"		3:45
12.	"Thnks fr th Mmrs"		3:28
13.	""The Take Over, the Breaks Over""		3:40
14.	"Dance, Dance"		3:10
15.	"Saturday"		3:53
Total length:			56:02

=== DVD ===
No.	Title	Length
1.	"Thriller"	5:04
2.	"Grand Theft Autumn/Where Is Your Boy"	3:15
3.	"Don't Matter (Akon cover)"
4.	"Sugar, We're Goin Down"	3:37
5.	"Our Lawyer Made Us Change the Name of This Song So We Wouldn't Get Sued"	3:01
6.	"Of All the Gin Joints in All the World"
7.	"Hum Hallelujah"	3:59
8.	"I Slept with Someone in Fall Out Boy and All I Got Was This Stupid Song Written About Me"
9.	"Tell That Mick He Just Made My List of Things to Do Today"	3:32
10.	"I'm Like a Lawyer with the Way I'm Always Trying to Get You Off (Me & You)"	3:30
11.	"A Little Less Sixteen Candles, a Little More "Touch Me""	2:49
12.	"Beat It" (Michael Jackson cover)	3:50
13.	"The Carpal Tunnel of Love"
14.	"Golden"	2:29
15.	"I Write Sins Not Tragedies" (Panic! at the Disco cover, contains excerpt from "The Seed (2.0)" by The Roots)
16.	"This Ain't a Scene, It's an Arms Race"	3:45
17.	"Thnks fr th Mmrs"	3:28
18.	""The Take Over, The Breaks Over""	3:40
19.	"One and Only" (Timbaland featuring Fall Out Boy cover)
20.	"Dance, Dance"	3:10
21.	"Andy Hurley drum solo"
22.	"Saturday"	3:53

==== Extra ====
- Videos:
1. "Sugar, We're Goin Down"
2. "Dance, Dance"
3. "A Little Less Sixteen Candles, a Little More "Touch Me""
4. "This Ain't a Scene, It's an Arms Race"
5. "Thnks fr th Mmrs"
6. "The Carpal Tunnel of Love"
7. ""The Take Over, the Breaks Over""
8. "I'm Like a Lawyer with the Way I'm Always Trying to Get You Off (Me & You)"
- Behind-the-scenes footage

==== Collector's Edition bonus CD ====
1. "This Ain't a Scene, It's an Arms Race" – 3:47
2. "The Carpal Tunnel of Love" – 3:20
3. ""The Take Over, the Breaks Over"" – 3:44
4. "I Slept with Someone in Fall Out Boy and All I Got Was This Stupid Song Written About Me" – 3:36
5. "Beat It" (featuring John Mayer, studio version) (Michael Jackson cover)

== Personnel ==
Fall Out Boy

- Patrick Stump – Lead vocals, rhythm guitar, piano
- Pete Wentz – Bass guitar, backing vocals, unclean vocals
- Joe Trohman – Lead guitar, backing vocals
- Andy Hurley – Drums

Additional

- Dirty – Encore and dancing along with the song "Dance, Dance"
- John Mayer – Guitar solo on "Beat It"
- Gabe Saporta – Guest vocals on "Grand Theft Autumn/Where Is Your Boy"
- Charlie Mark – Guest vocals on "I Slept with Someone in Fall Out Boy and All I Got Was This Stupid Song Written About Me"
- Andres Stuart – Guest vocals on "I Slept with Someone in Fall Out Boy and All I Got Was This Stupid Song Written About Me"
- Jim Sevcick – Guest vocals on "The Carpal Tunnel of Love"
- Adam Siska – Bass guitar on "Saturday"

== Certifications ==
Region	Certification	Certified units/sales
Australia (ARIA)	Gold	7,500^{^}
United States (RIAA)	Platinum	100,000^{^}
^{^} Shipments figures based on certification alone.
