= Leaked in London =

EP (live) by Fall Out Boy
- Released: February 6, 2007
- Recorded: Hammersmith Palais (London, England)
- Genres: Pop-punk; pop rock
- Length: 15:55
- Label: Island
- Producer: Fall Out Boy

Fall Out Boy chronology
Infinity on High (2007)	Leaked in London (2007)	Live in Phoenix (2008)

Leaked in London is a live EP that was recorded by American rock band Fall Out Boy on January 29, 2007. It was released in response to the band's third album, Infinity on High, being leaked onto the internet on January 19, 2007, three weeks before its official scheduled release. The EP could be downloaded from the band's website between Tuesday, February 6, 2007, and Tuesday, February 13, 2007, using the CDPass software along with inserting a physical copy of Infinity on High into the CD-ROM drive of one's computer.

== Track listing ==
No.	Title	Length
1.	"This Ain't a Scene, It's an Arms Race"	3:25
2.	"Thriller"	3:29
3.	"Dance, Dance"	3:15
4.	"Golden"	2:37
5.	"Our Lawyer Made Us Change the Name of This Song So We Wouldn't Get Sued"	3:09
Total length:		15:55

Notes

- These live versions of "Thriller", "Dance, Dance" and "Our Lawyer..." were also released as B-sides to "Thnks fr th Mmrs".
- These five live tracks are also available as bonus tracks on the limited Australian and New Zealand "Platinum Edition" CD/DVD pressings of Infinity on High.

== Personnel ==
- Patrick Stump – lead vocals, rhythm guitar, piano
- Pete Wentz – bass guitar, backing vocals
- Joe Trohman – lead guitar, backing vocals
- Andy Hurley – drums
