= Infinity on High =

2007 studio album by Fall Out Boy

Studio album by Fall Out Boy
- Released: February 6, 2007
- Recorded: December 2005 - January 2006; July – October 2006
- Studios: Pass (Los Angeles); Brandon's Way Recording (Los Angeles)
- Genres: Pop-punk; pop rock; emo; alternative rock
- Length: 47:49
- Label: Island
- Producers: Neal Avron; Babyface; Butch Walker; Patrick Stump

Fall Out Boy chronology
From Under the Cork Tree (2005)	Infinity on High (2007)	Leaked in London (2007)

Singles from Infinity on High
- 1. "This Ain't a Scene, It's an Arms Race" Released: December 5, 2006; 2. "The Carpal Tunnel of Love" Released: December 12, 2006; 3. "Thnks fr th Mmrs" Released: March 27, 2007; 4. "The Take Over, the Breaks Over" Released: July 2, 2007; 5. "I'm Like a Lawyer with the Way I'm Always Trying to Get You Off (Me & You)" Released: September 11, 2007

Infinity on High is the third studio album by American rock band Fall Out Boy, released on February 6, 2007, by Island Records. Recorded from July to October 2006 at Pass Studios in Los Angeles, California, its music was composed by lead singer and guitarist Patrick Stump and the lyrics were penned by bassist Pete Wentz. The album features collaborations with new producers and guest artists, such as Babyface and Jay-Z, and sees the band experimenting with genres including R&B, soul, and flamenco. Fall Out Boy also utilized instruments such as horns, violins, and pianos, which had not been used on previous releases.

As reported by Billboard, the band "[drifted] further from its pop punk roots to write increasingly accessible pop tunes", a slight departure from the group's previous sound. Critics felt that its lyrics served as a response to the band's rise to fame. Fall Out Boy embarked on several tours to promote the album, including the Friends or Enemies Tour, the Honda Civic Tour, and the Young Wild Things Tour.

Infinity on High debuted at number one on the US Billboard 200, selling over 260,000 copies in its first week of sales and becoming the band's first number-one album. It also reached number one in New Zealand and peaked within the top-five of countries including Canada, the United Kingdom, and Australia. Five songs were released as singles, four of which charted on the US Billboard Hot 100; the second single, "This Ain't a Scene, It's an Arms Race", peaked at number two. The album received generally positive reviews from critics, with many praising Stump's vocals and the band's new musical direction, and has sold over two million copies worldwide and over 1.4 million in the United States alone.

== Background ==
After taking a two-month break following the band's Black Clouds and Underdogs tour in promotion of their 2005 album From Under the Cork Tree, Fall Out Boy returned to the studio to begin work on their follow-up effort. The band began writing songs for the new album while touring, and intended to quickly make a new album in order to keep momentum in the wake of their breakthrough success. Vocalist Patrick Stump stated that he wished to begin working on the record earlier, but the group's management urged the members to take time off to recuperate from their constant touring schedule.

The band's label, Island Records, underwent changes while the group prepared to record, which postponed the studio schedule for three weeks. Bassist/lyricist Pete Wentz asserted that "We're definitely writing all the time, so we're not going to try to squeeze every last drop out of the stone. That's part of what's been wrong with the rock industry: they keep fans waiting far too long, and bands go away and disappear off the face of the planet. That's not the way it's going to be for Fall Out Boy." During this time off, Fall Out Boy contributed a cover of the song "What's This?" for the 2006 rerelease of The Nightmare Before Christmas soundtrack, as well as a remix of their song "Of All the Gin Joints in All the World" for the Snakes on a Plane soundtrack. Wentz also purchased a house in Los Angeles, where he spent much time writing lyrics to new songs.

== Recording and production ==
The second you worry about other people’s expectations is the second you can expect failure. Not that we didn't have big hopes for this album—we wanted our fans to love it more than anything. But put it this way: We don’t sit around second-guessing everything. If you do that, you’re bound to make sterile music, and that’s when you can expect failure.

— -Patrick Stump, on the pressures of making a follow-up to Cork Tree.

While writing the album, Fall Out Boy began searching for potential producers. The band sought out R&B singer/producer Babyface, as they admired his work on the soundtrack to the 2001 film version of Josie and the Pussycats. Babyface saw one of the interviews in which the band discussed its desire to work with him and contacted the group. Babyface produced two of the songs, "I'm Like a Lawyer with the Way I'm Always Trying to Get You Off (Me & You)" and "Thnks fr th Mmrs". Neal Avron, who also produced the band's previous album, handled production for eleven of Infinity on High's fourteen tracks. Before recording, the band began with six weeks of pre-production, which was encouraged by Avron. This period included both rehearsals and writing, as well as working out all the sounds and arrangements. It began in Chicago before the group relocated to the Swing House studios in Los Angeles. Additionally, some rough recordings of songs were created to be used in the studio as a future reference.

Infinity on High was recorded from July to October 2006 at the Pass Studios in Los Angeles. Much of the writing process was done individually by the band members. Generally, Wentz would write his lyrics first and send them to Stump, who would create a melody by playing guitar along to the words to "find a groove". Stump's goal with his songs was to create his music while changing Wentz's original lyrics as little as possible. After a melody was written, Stump would create a general rhythm for the song. Although Fall Out Boy has no specific rhythm or lead guitar roles, Stump viewed himself as more of a rhythm guitarist on the album due to his experience as a drummer in previous bands. Guitarist Joe Trohman often wrote his guitar parts after hearing Stump's work, filling in the "empty spaces" in the songs with "tons of guitars and Johnny Marr-type atmospheric parts". The group felt that this writing process helped create a more full sound.

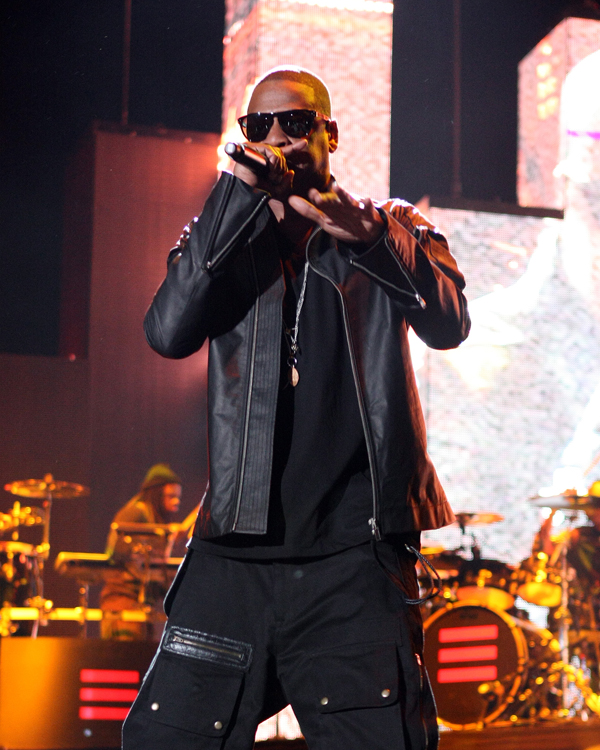
Rapper Jay-Z recorded his spoken-word intro to "Thriller" while on tour in Australia.

Upon listening to the finished tracks, the members selected guest appearances they felt would work with the songs. The group "aim[ed] for the stars" on its choices of collaborators, with Wentz stating, "I want to bring in people who no one would expect...This year it's like, we made some new friends, like Lil Wayne. Or let's get Jay-Z on there." Wentz commented on working with Jay-Z, saying "It was insane. We called him up and thought we were gonna talk to his assistant. Then he answers the phone, like, 'Yo, this is Hov,' and we were like, 'Um ...' It just happened like that. And it was pretty crazy." Jay-Z recorded his introduction to the album's opening song "Thriller" while on tour in Australia and sent it to the band, who later put the vocal on the album. At a fashion show in Los Angeles, Wentz met rapper Kanye West, who invited Wentz and Stump to his home to share new music. West then agreed to create a remix of "This Ain't a Scene, It's an Arms Race" three weeks before the scheduled release of the album. The band was unable to include the remix on the album due to time constraints, but a remix of West's version featuring Lil Wayne, Lupe Fiasco, Travis McCoy, Paul Wall and Tyga was released in July 2007.

During the recording of the album, the band members pursued other various activities. Stump, who co-produced "Don't You Know Who I Think I Am?" from Infinity on High, was also working on fellow Fueled By Ramen act The Hush Sound's album Like Vines. Wentz was conceiving a social networking website called FriendsOrEnemies.com as well as designing for his clothing line, Clandestine Industries. Wentz was often interviewed about the album at Clandestine fashion shows.

== Composition ==
=== Music ===
This Ain't A Scene, It's An Arms Race
This sample of the song demonstrates the track's hip-hop and funk influences. It also features a repeating guitar riff throughout. The group's "genre bending" musical experimentation was influenced by new wave bands such as Blondie.

"I'm Like a Lawyer with the Way I'm Always Trying to Get You Off (Me & You)"
This clip highlights Stump's evolved vocal style, which was considered to be reminiscent of R&B and soul music. This was one of the two Babyface-produced tracks from the album.

The album marked a departure in Fall Out Boy's sound in which the band implemented a diverse array of musical styles. As reported by Billboard, Fall Out Boy "drifts further from its hardcore punk roots to write increasingly accessible pop tunes," a slight departure from the group's previous more pop-punk sound. Infinity on High has been compared to the work of pop-punk bands such as Green Day, with Ann Powers of the Los Angeles Times commenting, "Whatever snot and feedback courses through these songs, sweetness always triumphs, carried forth by bubblegum bass lines, snappy drums and tunes as comforting as lullabies." Stump explained that the album contains a variety of different moods: "It’s one of those things where you get older as a band and you do your own thing...The older Fall Out Boy elements, from the early records, are definitely there, and this album is an extension of that."

"Thriller"
Jay-Z's introduction to "Thriller" opens and introduces the album. Fall Out Boy guitarist Joe Trohman plays a strong "chugging pulse".

The album opens with the song Thriller, which was named after the 1982 Michael Jackson album Thriller, and which itself led with a spoken introduction from Jay-Z, who owned the record label that produced the album, Def Jam Recordings. Pete Wentz told the music television channel MTV that the band called Jay Z on the phone to get his introduction for the song. In an interview with Fall Out Boy, drummer Andy Hurley stated that the opening parts in "Thriller" were copied from "Islands to Burn" by Racetraitor, a band he once drummed for.

The song was created as an reflection on the band's previous two years. Some lyrics reflect on previous mediocre album reviews the band received. The lyrics also call out the rise of the band's popularity, "But by fall we were a cover story". In context the song's opening lines are, "Last summer we took threes across the board, but by fall we were a cover story now in stores. Make us poster boys for your scene, but we are not making an acceptance speech." The song also features the lyric "Fix me in 45" which refers to the way singles were released on vinyl records. Some reviewers complained that the album did not have a hardcore edge, but the song "Thriller" was an exception. Slant Magazine said the song features "a crunching, emo-fied knockoff of the riff from Metallica’s "One"", while Jack Phinney of the Northern Valley Suburbanite reviewed the album and called the song "spectacular". Alternative Press opined in February 2023 that the song was dominated by the soaring vocals of Patrick Stump and his pop arrangement, and described it as the tenth heaviest song in the Fall Out Boy body of work. Writing in August 2023, Tamzin Kraftman wrote that the song's "chugging pulse", played by Fall Out Boy guitarist Joe Trohman, "electrifies the track". In February 2013, the band led a concert at Webster Hall with the track; Rolling Stone's Andy Greene opined that, upon launching into the song, the audience's "squeals were deafening".

Stump called "This Ain't a Scene, It's an Arms Race" the "funkiest thing we’ve ever done", and attributes the change in musical style to his love of soul music, which he acquired by listening to oldies stations as a child. Wentz describes the song "a bit of '70s funk mixed with [the band’s 2003 album] Take This to Your Grave with tight verses and big, fat choruses". The song closing sing-along was influenced by Justin Timberlake's "Señorita". Cory Apar of Allmusic compared the Babyface-produced track "I'm Like a Lawyer with the Way I'm Always Trying to Get You Off (Me & You)" to Maroon 5. Wentz characterized Stump's vocal performance on the song as "straight-up Motown", continuing to say "If there wasn't a rock band playing, it'd be straight R&B, and he'd go on tour with just an upright bass and a drum and open up for R. Kelly." "The Carpal Tunnel of Love" has been referred to as "a prime slab of what the boys have become famous for: highly caffeinated pop-punk mixed with a little white-boy soul and some hard-core yelping." The song features Stump singing in a falsetto in the chorus over Trohman's "crunchy" guitars, as well as a breakdown in which Wentz employs death growl-style vocals.

The band also used instruments that did not appear on previous albums, such as horns and violins. The members became more open to experimentation, but attempted to not over-produce the album; Stump stated that he "had to resist the temptation to use a lot of strings." "Golden" consists exclusively of vocals, piano and organ, and Stump dubbed the song "much softer than anything we’ve ever done". The group utilizes a full horn section on "I've Got All This Ringing in My Ears and None on My Fingers", a track which has been likened to Queen. Violins are used on both "Thnks fr th Mmrs", in addition to an acoustic guitar strummed flamenco-style, and "The (After) Life of the Party", which also features electronic-influenced sounds. Commenting on the instruments used on "Thnks fr th Mmrs", Stump stated "I never thought I'd get a euphonium onto a Fall Out Boy record". "You're Crashing, But You're No Wave" features a gospel choir, while "Thriller" contains a spoken-word intro from Jay-Z. Barry Nicolson of NME referred to the song as a "towering, Foo Fighters-esque slice of thunderous rhythm and radio-friendly melody." Critics have described the album as being a pop-punk, pop rock, pop, and alternative rock album.

=== Lyrics ===
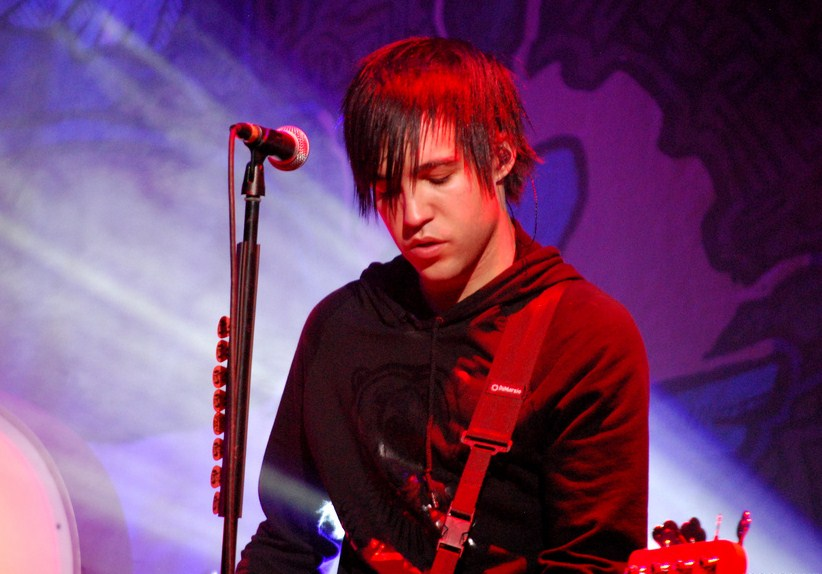
Bassist/lyricist Pete Wentz was lyrically inspired by rapper Lil Wayne on the album.

While writing the album, Wentz drew lyrical inspiration from rapper Lil Wayne, whom he called "the best lyricist of [2006]." Speaking of Infinity on High's lyrical themes, Wentz stated, "On the last record, the lyrics were about 'This is where we're going to be a year from now, and this is what you're going to be saying about us.' But this time, we realized that a lot of bands should spend less time running their mouths and more time writing their songs." In 2013, Wentz reflected, "on a record like Infinity on High, I feel like I tried really hard to explain my perspective – and when I look back on it in hindsight I think it’s an extremely unrelatable record. Critics felt that much of the lyrics address the band's rise to fame and the pressure of maintaining a loyal fanbase. Sasha Frere-Jones of The New Yorker commented that "The only top-ten acts that talk about fame as much as Fall Out Boy does are rappers, although their take on selling records is less conflicted." Cory Apar of Allmusic opined that "Wentz' lyrics are oftentimes resentful, full of fame-induced angst, and really emphasize his need to drive home his position that stardom has not changed the band."

"Thriller" serves as an autobiographical recap of the two years following From Under the Cork Tree's release, referencing the band's mediocre CD reviews and breakout success, as well as thanking their "diehard" fans. The song discusses the band's Best New Artist Grammy loss, and Wentz calls it the "most narcissistic song on the album". The line "Fix me in forty-five" is a reference to the length of a therapy session. On "This Ain't a Scene, It's an Arms Race", Wentz uses wartime-inspired metaphors to discuss their newfound popularity; he called the song "kind of a tongue-in-cheek look at the way we are so addicted and obsessed with new arts, cultures and loves – to the point where it just becomes oversaturated." "I'm Like a Lawyer..." has been described as "about as close to a love song as you'll get from this band, a rare moment of tenderness among songs about blog entries, guest lists, and therapy sessions." In a tribute to the politicized Chicago hardcore scene, Wentz describes the story of a rigged court case of African-American civil rights activist Fred Hampton Jr. in "You're Crashing, But You're No Wave". The song has been described as a "very well-written track, a welcome respite from the one-liners which permeate the majority of the record."

== Packaging and title ==
The album's title is taken from a letter written by Vincent van Gogh to his brother Theo in 1888, in which he describes his renewed health and the positive effect it has had on his painting. Originally written in Dutch, Van Gogh's phrasing has been translated as "Be clearly aware of the stars and infinity on high. Then life seems almost enchanted after all". Speaking of the title shortly after its announcement in November 2006, Wentz stated "As for what that means in relation to the record, we'll just let it unfold when people hear it." While Wentz declined to reveal the relationship between the title and the album's songs, MTV reporter James Montgomery opined that "It's not difficult to see it as a statement about the band rising above detractors and finding strength within themselves."

The photography for the album was done by Pamela Littky, and the sets on the album artwork were designed by Todd Fjelsted. Chuck Anderson of NoPattern designed the artwork for the album. A winged sheep named Franklyn is depicted on the cover of the album in a bedroom with the moon and stars in the background, while the inside of the CD booklet features "tarot card" designs with photos of each of the band members.

== Promotion ==
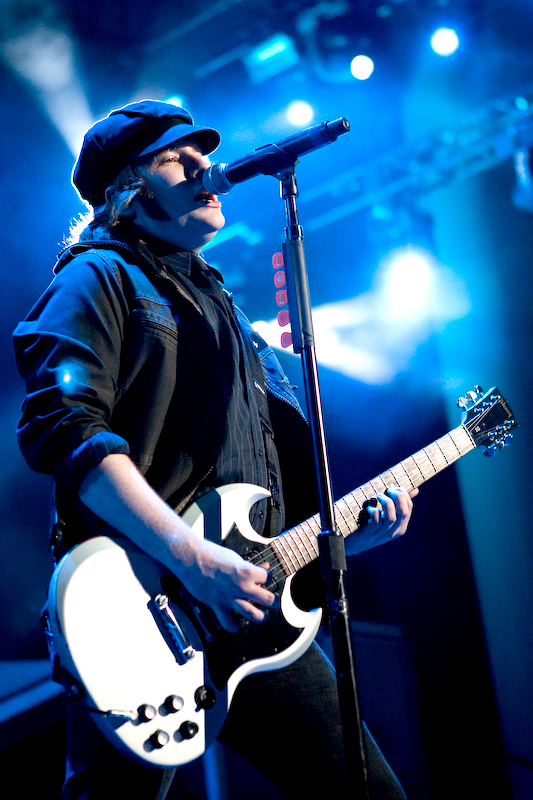
Vocalist/guitarist Patrick Stump performing on June 13, 2007, as part of the Honda Civic Tour.

Promotion for the album began in November 2006 with the band performing "This Ain't a Scene, It's an Arms Race" for the first time at the American Music Awards on November 21. The song was shipped to radio the same night as the performance. In the week following the performance, the single was the top added track at Pop and Alternative radio. While the song was the first song revealed from the album, it would not receive an official single release until January 2007. "The Carpal Tunnel of Love" was released as a digital single in December 2006. It was a minor hit in the United States, peaking at 81 on the Billboard Hot 100. The band then began the Friends or Enemies Tour in January 2007 to build interest in the album. The tour consisted of intimate club shows in fifteen cities throughout the United States, with New Found Glory, The Early November, Permanent Me and Lifetime. Two weeks before Infinity on High was released, the album was leaked online, which led to rumors on the band's message boards that the album would be released a week early. Although these rumors were incorrect, Fall Out Boy responded to the leak by including an exclusive live EP, Leaked in London, recorded in London's Hammersmith Palais at their sold-out show on January 29, 2007, with each purchase to encourage fans to buy the album. The EP could be downloaded from the band's website between Tuesday, February 6, 2007, and Tuesday, February 13, 2007, using CDPass software along with inserting a physical copy of Infinity on High into the CD-ROM drive of one's computer. Infinity on High was the final release from Rabid Neurosis, a warez organization responsible for leaking 20,000 albums before their release.

On February 6, 2007, the day of the album's release, Fall Out Boy played three free shows, each in a different city in the United States. The day started with a morning performance in Times Square in New York City, followed by a gig in the band's hometown of Chicago, and then a late-night show in Los Angeles. In March 2008, Fall Out Boy attempted to enter The Guinness Book of World Records for being the only band to perform in all seven continents in nine months, planning to perform in Antarctica for an audience of scientists while working with Greenpeace to raise awareness about global warming. However, the group was unable to make the flight from Punta Arenas, Chile to Antarctica due to poor weather. Instead, Wentz and Stump went on to break the world record for the most interviews conducted by a duo in a 24-hour period, setting the mark at seventy-four.

To promote the album after its release, Fall Out Boy embarked on an extensive tour schedule, with concerts across the United States, Canada, Australia, New Zealand, South Africa, Europe and Asia. It began with the 2007 Honda Civic Tour with Paul Wall, +44, The Academy Is..., and Cobra Starship. The tour was originally planned to begin on April 18, 2007, but the band decided to postpone the date until May 11, citing health issues and exhaustion. Wentz stated "It's a health issue, but not a health issue that anyone needs to worry about. It's not life-threatening, it's more about being overworked and worn down." In honor of the tour, the group designed a custom Honda Civic Hybrid which was given away to a fan in a contest. Wentz described the tour as "our biggest show ever", with Stump adding that "We've been working really hard to make this show look and sound the best it's ever been for Fall Out Boy." For a Kiss-inspired fan contest, Wentz's brother created prints of images based on the record, created with ink mixed with the band members' blood. The band gave away prints to winners at every stop on the Honda Civic Tour. Wentz hoped that the contest would serve to "[shed] some light on the much-needed support for blood drives." A live concert CD and DVD recorded at a show in Phoenix was later released in 2008, entitled Live in Phoenix.

The band also headlined the Young Wild Things Tour, an international arena tour featuring Gym Class Heroes, Plain White T's and Cute Is What We Aim For. Of the thirty one dates, twenty nine were in the US with two in Canada. The tour was inspired by Maurice Sendak's 1963 children's book Where the Wild Things Are, and included sets designed by artist Rob Dobi containing images from the book. Commenting on the decision to incorporate elements from the book, Wentz explained "Where the Wild Things Are is a great narrative. It encapsulates pretty much every FOB song ever written: You know, tantrums and monster islands and all."

== Singles ==
Four songs were released as singles from the album's fourteen tracks, of which three charted on the US Billboard Hot 100 and all reaching international charts. Infinity on High was spurred on by the lead single "This Ain't a Scene, It's an Arms Race", which became the highest-charting song for band and their first to chart worldwide. Wentz commented on the band's decision to pick "This Ain't a Scene..." as a single, saying "There may be other songs on the record that would be bigger radio hits, but this one had the right message." It was sent to radio weeks before its digital release in January 2007; upon digital release the track debuted and peaked at number two on the Hot 100 where it stayed at that position for two consecutive weeks, spending nine weeks in the top ten. The single sold 162,000 digital downloads in its opening week, breaking various music industry records and becoming the highest debut of 2007. With this total it was the largest opening-week tally for a group since Nielsen SoundScan began tracking digital sales in 2003 and set a new record for the highest bow for a band since radio only titles joined the chart in 1998. It also reached number one on the defunct-Pop 100, number one on Billboard Digital Songs and came at number eight on Alternative Songs. Internationally, "This Ain't a Scene..." debuted and peaked inside the top ten of many charts. It reached number one in New Zealand, number two in the UK, number four and Platinum status in Australia, number four on the Canadian Hot 100 and in Ireland, and placed at number nine on the European Hot 100.

"Thnks fr th Mmrs" was released as the second single in the US in March 2007. It peaked at number eleven on the Hot 100 with twenty-eight chart weeks before it was retired. It came at number five on Digital Songs, but performed weaker on the Radio Songs chart at number forty. It reached the two-million sales mark week ending December 27, 2009 in the US. Its highest charting was in Australia where it peaked at number three on the Australian ARIA chart and achieved Platinum status in the region. In New Zealand, the UK, Canada and Ireland "Thnks fr th Mmrs" reached the top twenty.

""The Take Over, the Breaks Over"" was released in August 2007 in the US as the third single and failed to chart on the Hot 100, although it did reach number 48 on the UK Singles Chart, with its highest position at number seventeen in Australia, becoming the third consecutive top twenty hit from Infinity on High in that region. The fourth and last single, "I'm Like a Lawyer with the Way I'm Always Trying to Get You Off (Me & You)" managed to reach number 68 in the US and made the top 30 in Australia. "The Carpal Tunnel of Love" was not an official single but it was released online by the band before Infinity's release and was later given as an exclusive download to iTunes; it managed to reach number eighty-one on the Hot 100.

== Critical reception ==
Professional ratings
Aggregate scores
Source	Rating
Metacritic	75/100
Review scores
Source	Rating
AllMusic	3.5/5 stars
The A.V. Club	B+
Blender	3.5/5 stars
Entertainment Weekly	A−
The Guardian	3/5 stars
NME	7/10
Q	4/5 stars
Rolling Stone	3.5/5 stars
Spin	4/5 stars
USA Today	3/4 stars

Critical response for Infinity on High was generally positive, with many praising Stump's vocals and the album's new musical direction. At Metacritic, which assigns a normalized rating out of 100 to reviews from mainstream critics, the album received an average score of 75, based on 23 reviews, which indicates "generally favorable reviews". Jody Rosen of Entertainment Weekly commended the band's "new sense of swing" on its R&B-influenced songs and noted that Stump "has evolved into a superb frontman." Dave de Silva of Sputnikmusic agreed about Stump's new vocal style, saying that "his tone is smoother and more well-rounded, he’s cut out the borderline screechy high-end which made parts of the previous album unlistenable and, though occasionally still nasally, his tones are far more varied and adaptable to different styles" as well as calling Wentz' lyrics "as sharp as ever". Andrew Blackie of PopMatters called the album "wildly exciting and experimental" and felt it greatly improved upon From Under the Cork Tree. Aaron Burgess of The A.V. Club enjoyed the disc's new pop direction and felt that the songs that were more typical of Fall Out Boy's original sound, such as "The Carpal Tunnel of Love" undermined the album's potential. Sven Philipp of Billboard called Infinity on High a "shamelessly melodic, wild and powerful pop record" and referred to Stump as the album's "true surprise". The album was ranked No. 38 on Q's 50 Best Albums of 2007.

However, some critics felt that the album was overly ambitious and that the band's musical departure may alienate listeners. Chad Grischow of IGN felt that the album's dramatic hooks seem "bloated" at times: "The band does a great of focusing on what they do best, but the album does drown itself a bit with all the overwhelming enormity of it all." Scott Shetler of Slant disliked the "melodramatic" undertones of "I've Got All This Ringing in My Ears and None on My Fingers" and "Golden", writing "they don't handle that style quite as well as Panic! at the Disco". Cory Apar of AllMusic opined that the album's pop direction contradicts the band's lyrical claims of wishing to stick to their roots. He called the album's various styles "hit and miss", yet commented that "Once Infinity on High sinks in, it's indeed a fun record. But for a band that was once so self-assured and able to utilize its talents so compellingly, the album is regrettably haphazard." Caroline Sullivan of The Guardian believed that the album was overly sullen, but noted that "They may not be happy, but they haven't forgotten to be catchy." Barry Nicholson of NME found the number of guest producers to be unnecessary and disliked some of the songs, but admired the album's "infectious" nature.

== Commercial performance ==
Infinity on High was a major commercial success, debuting at number one on the US Billboard 200 chart, with first week sales of 260,000 copies in the United States, according to Nielsen SoundScan. As of February 2013, Infinity has sold 1.4 million copies in the US. It was the band's first US number one album and second consecutive top ten effort, as its previous release, From Under the Cork Tree, peaked at number nine. The album spent its first six weeks in the top ten, out of a total of fifty two chart weeks. Infinity on High also opened at number one on Billboard's Rock Albums, Tastemaker Albums, and Digital Albums charts, with over 27,000 digital sales making up the total first week tally. In its second week, it fell to number five on the Billboard 200, selling 119,000 copies with a 54% decline during a post-Grammy week. The album rose to number three in its third week with 79,000 units sold. In its fourth week, the disc slipped to number four and sold 67,000 copies. Infinity on High's sales again fell in its fifth week, moving 58,000 copies and descending to number eight on the chart. In its sixth and last week in the top ten it fell to number nine and sold 43,000 copies. In April 2007, the album was certified Platinum by the Recording Industry Association of America (RIAA), denoting the shipment of one million copies. It finished the year at number twenty-one on IFPI's list of the "Top 50 Global Best Selling Albums of 2007". Infinity on High has shipped over two million copies worldwide.

The album also charted inside the top five worldwide, making it the band's most successful and breakthrough album internationally. Infinity on High charted all over Europe, debuting at number eight on Billboard's European Albums chart. In Australia, it debuted at its peak of number four on the Australian ARIA Albums Chart. It remained on the Australian chart for a total of fifty weeks, spending its first seven weeks in the top ten. In its 31st chart week it broke into the top ten again where it remained for another six weeks in a row, accumulating a total of thirteen weeks in the top ten. The CD was certified Double Platinum by the Australian Recording Industry Association (ARIA), denoting shipments of 140,000 copies. Infinity on High debuted at number one in New Zealand, and remained at the top position for six consecutive weeks, logging a total of thirty-seven chart weeks, making it the fifth longest chart sitter on the New Zealand charts in 2007. After marking its first twelve weeks in the top ten, it went on to spend a combined total of twenty-six weeks inside the top twenty and received a Platinum accreditation from the Recording Industry Association of New Zealand (RIANZ) for 15,000 shipments. In the United Kingdom, the album debuted at number three with 64,054 first week sales and made nine weeks in the top twenty, being certified Platinum by the British Phonographic Industry (BPI) for 300,000 units shipped. It went on to sell 446,807 in the UK to date January 2015. The album debuted at number two in Canada with 21,000 first week sales. Infinity was certified Platinum by Music Canada for shipments of 100,000 units. In Ireland, the record peaked at number six according to the Irish Recorded Music Association with fourteen weeks within the top twenty, and also went Platinum there. After entering the French albums chart at number 64, Infinity on High reached its peak of number 17 and held on for 64 weeks in the top 150.

== Track listing ==
=== Original release ===
All tracks are written by Fall Out Boy, except where noted.

No.	Title	Writer(s)	Producer(s)	Length
1.	"Thriller" (featuring Jay-Z)		Neal Avron	3:30
2.	""The Take Over, the Breaks Over""		Avron	3:34
3.	"This Ain't a Scene, It's an Arms Race"		Avron	3:32
4.	"I'm Like a Lawyer with the Way I'm Always Trying to Get You Off (Me & You)"		Babyface	3:31
5.	"Hum Hallelujah"	Fall Out Boy; Leonard Cohen	Avron	3:50
6.	"Golden"	Fall Out Boy; Wesley Eisold	Avron	2:32
7.	"Thnks fr th Mmrs"		Babyface	3:23
8.	"Don't You Know Who I Think I Am?"		Butch Walker; Patrick Stump	2:51
9.	"The (After) Life of the Party"		Avron	3:21
10.	"The Carpal Tunnel of Love"	Fall Out Boy; Eisold	Avron	3:23
11.	"Bang the Doldrums"	Fall Out Boy; Eisold	Avron	3:31
12.	"Fame < Infamy"		Avron	3:06
13.	"You're Crashing, But You're No Wave" (featuring Butch Walker)		Avron	3:42
14.	"I've Got All This Ringing in My Ears and None on My Fingers"		Avron	4:06
Total length:				47:49

UK, Australian and New Zealand bonus track
No.	Title	Length
15.	"G.I.N.A.S.F.S." ("Gay Is Not a Synonym for Shitty")	3:15
Total length:		51:04

Japanese bonus track
No.	Title	Length
15.	"It's Hard to Say "I Do", When I Don't"	3:24
Total length:		51:13

Latin America bonus track
No.	Title	Length
15.	"Dance, Dance"	3:00
Total length:		50:49

Australian/New Zealand tour edition bonus tracks
No.	Title	Length
15.	"G.I.N.A.S.F.S." ("Gay Is Not a Synonym for Shitty")	3:15
16.	"It's Hard to Say "I Do", When I Don't"	3:24
17.	"Dance, Dance" (live from Hammersmith Palais)	3:15
18.	"Golden" (live from Hammersmith Palais)	2:38
19.	"This Ain't a Scene, It's an Arms Race" (live from Hammersmith Palais)	3:26
20.	"Our Lawyer Made Us Change the Name of This Song So We Wouldn't Get Sued" (live from Hammersmith Palais)	3:11
21.	"Thriller" (live from Hammersmith Palais)	3:31
Total length:		70:29

=== Australian/New Zealand tour edition bonus DVD ===
No.	Title	Length
1.	"This Ain't a Scene, It's an Arms Race" (live on AOL)
2.	""The Take Over, the Breaks Over"" (live on AOL)
3.	"Thriller" (live on AOL)
4.	"Sugar, We're Goin Down" (live on AOL)
5.	"This Ain't a Scene, It's an Arms Race" (music video)
6.	"Thnks fr th Mmrs" (music video)
7.	""The Take Over, the Breaks Over"" (music video)

=== Deluxe edition ===
Deluxe limited edition bonus CD
No.	Title	Length
1.	"G.I.N.A.S.F.S." ("Gay Is Not a Synonym for Shitty")	3:15
2.	"It's Hard to Say "I Do", When I Don't"	3:24
3.	"Dance, Dance" (live from Hammersmith Palais)	3:15
4.	"This Ain't a Scene, It's an Arms Race" (live from Hammersmith Palais)	3:26
5.	"Thriller" (live from Hammersmith Palais)	3:31
Total length:		16:50

== Personnel ==
Fall Out Boy

- Andy Hurley
- Patrick Stump
- Joe Trohman
- Pete Wentz

Guest artists

- Jay-Z – Intro and outro in "Thriller"
- Ryan Ross – guitar solo in "The Take Over, the Breaks Over"
- Chad Gilbert – guitar solo in "The Take Over, the Breaks Over"
- Butch Walker – guest vocalist in "You're Crashing, But You're No Wave"; crowd vocals on "This Ain't a Scene, It's an Arms Race", "Hum Hallelujah", and "Bang the Doldrums"
- Sofia Toufa – crowd vocals on "This Ain't a Scene, It's an Arms Race", "Hum Hallelujah", and "Bang the Doldrums"
- Lindsey Blaufarb – crowd vocals on "This Ain't a Scene, It's an Arms Race", "Hum Hallelujah", and "Bang the Doldrums"
- Babyface – B3 organ on "I'm Like a Lawyer with the Way I'm Always Trying to Get You Off (Me & You)" and mandolin on "Thnks fr th Mmrs"
- Ron Lewis – string arrangements on "Thnks fr th Mmrs"
- The Movement Orchestra – strings on "Thnks fr th Mmrs"
- Los Angeles Master Chorale – crowd vocals in "You're Crashing, But You're No Wave"
- Ken Wiley – French horn
- Nick Lane – bass trombone
- Darrell Leonard – euphonium, horn arrangements on "The (After) Life of the Party" and "I've Got All This Ringing in My Ears and None on My Fingers"
- Guy Bettison – pan flute

Design

- Nate Newell and Liz Roth – styling
- Louis Marino – art direction
- Chuck Anderson – illustration and design
- Pamela Litty – photography

Production

- Neal Avron – producer, recording, mixing
- Babyface – producer on tracks: 4 and 7
- Butch Walker, Patrick Stump – producers on "Don't You Know Who I Think I Am?"
- Paul Boutin – recording on tracks: 4 and 7
- Erich Talaba – additional engineering
- Zeph Sowers, Scott Riebling – assistant recording
- Tom Lord-Alge – mixing on tracks: 4 and 7
- George Gumbs – mixing assistant
- Ted Jensen – mastering at Sterling Sound, New York City

== Charts ==
=== Weekly charts ===
Chart (2007)	Peak position
Australian Albums (ARIA)	3
Austrian Albums (Ö3 Austria)	28
Belgian Albums (Ultratop Flanders)	44
Belgian Albums (Ultratop Wallonia)	36
Canadian Albums (Billboard)	2
Dutch Albums (Album Top 100)	45
Finnish Albums (Suomen virallinen lista)	37
French Albums (SNEP)	17
German Albums (Offizielle Top 100)	25
Irish Albums (IRMA)	6
Japanese Albums (Oricon)	11
Mexican Albums (Top 100 Mexico)	21
New Zealand Albums (RMNZ)	1
Scottish Albums (Official Charts)	2
Swedish Albums (Sverigetopplistan)	31
Swiss Albums (Schweizer Hitparade)	75
UK Albums (Official Charts)	3
US Billboard 200	1
US Top Rock Albums (Billboard)	1
US Indie Store Album Sales (Billboard)	1

=== Year-end charts ===
Chart (2007)	Peak position
Australian Albums Chart	14
French Albums (SNEP)	68
New Zealand Albums (RMNZ)	12
UK Albums (OCC)	40
US Billboard 200	33
US Top Rock Albums (Billboard)	6
Worldwide Albums (IFPI)	21

== Certifications ==
Certifications for Infinity on High
Region	Certification	Certified units/sales
Argentina (CAPIF)	Platinum	60,000^{^}
Australia (ARIA)	2× Platinum	140,000^{^}
Canada (Music Canada)	Platinum	100,000^{^}
Ireland (IRMA)	Platinum	15,000^{^}
Japan (RIAJ)	Gold	100,000^{^}
New Zealand (RMNZ)	2× Platinum	30,000^{‡}
Russia (NFPF)	Platinum	20,000^{*}
United Kingdom (BPI)	2× Platinum	600,000^{‡}
United States (RIAA)	3× Platinum	3,000,000^{‡}
^{*} Sales figures based on certification alone.^{^} Shipments figures based on certification alone.^{‡} Sales+streaming figures based on certification alone.
