= The Take Over, the Breaks Over =

2007 single by Fall Out Boy

""The Take Over, The Breaks Over""

Single by Fall Out Boy

from the album Infinity on High
- B-side: "Thriller" (live); "Sugar, We're Goin Down" (live)
- Released: July 2, 2007
- Studio: Pass (Los Angeles)
- Length: 3:33
- Label: Island; Mercury
- Songwriters: Pete Wentz; Patrick Stump; Joe Trohman; Andy Hurley
- Producer: Neal Avron

Fall Out Boy singles chronology
"Thnks fr th Mmrs" (2007)	""The Take Over, The Breaks Over"" (2007)	"I'm Like a Lawyer (Me & You)" (2007)

Music video
- ""The Take Over, the Breaks Over"" on YouTube

""The Take Over, the Breaks Over"" [sic] (rendered with quotation marks as part of its title on the album track listing) is a song by American rock band Fall Out Boy and the fourth single from their third studio album Infinity on High (2007). The song was released in the United Kingdom on July 2, 2007, and in the United States on August 6. The music composition was inspired by vocalist and guitarist Patrick Stump's love of David Bowie, specifically the song "Rebel Rebel"; the lyrics were penned by bassist Pete Wentz. The song's title is a reference to Jay-Z's 2001 song "Takeover".

The single found its greatest success in Australia, peaking at No. 17 on the singles chart there and finishing at No. 90 on the year-end chart. It was also released as a 7-inch vinyl in several countries, including the UK. The song's music video won a Canadian MuchMusic Video Award for People's Choice: Favorite International Video, beating Flo Rida, Kanye West, Rihanna, and Timbaland. It was also nominated for Best International Video – Group at the ceremony but lost to Linkin Park's "Bleed It Out".

== Music ==
For the music, vocalist/guitarist Patrick Stump undertook his usual role as the band's primary composer.

"I remember reading an interview with David Bowie where he said, "One day I decided to write a song that sounded like the Rolling Stones"─you know, where the riff is the entire song? And that's how he wrote "Rebel Rebel." I wanted to do the same with "The Take Over.” Classic Rock? Yeah, sure, I guess it is." --Patrick Stump, on the song's style.

== Chart performance ==
In Australia, the song peaked at No. 17 on the ARIA Singles Chart, becoming the third consecutive top-20 single from Infinity on High in that region. It finished at No. 90 on the year-end singles charts in Australia. Despite spending six weeks in the UK Top 75, ""The Take Over, the Breaks Over"" became the band's first single to fail to chart in the UK Top 40 since all the singles from Fall Out Boy's 2003 Take This to Your Grave album failed; it peaked at No. 48 in the UK Singles Chart on July 8, 2007. It dropped down to No. 56 the following week before rising again to No. 48 during its third week. The song reached No. 30 in New Zealand.

== Music video ==
=== Technical information ===
Alan Ferguson directed the music video for the song, having worked with the band previously. Sheira Rees-Davies and Luke Joerger handled production duties. Post production and VFX work was done by Jeff Spangler. The music video is shot in grayscale and was filmed in one day.

=== Plot ===
The video begins with Hemingway (Pete's dog), who is lying with Pete on his couch. The camera zooms into his mind (which, as it is doing so, is set to some of Fall Out Boy's earlier songs such as "Grand Theft Autumn/Where Is Your Boy", "This Ain't a Scene, It's an Arms Race" and "Dance, Dance", to where Alex Wolff (from The Naked Brothers Band) is posing as Pete with Hemingway, as if being a younger Wentz.

Then the band is performing the song. As they sing the chorus, strange things begin to happen such as Patrick growing a steak body and a cat head, along with breakdancing mailmen and cat ladies appearing (including dancer Olivia Cipolla). Through the guitar solo, an angry mob appears and blames the band for changing (a reference to the band's changing genre from a more punk rock sound to a more pop rock/pop-punk sound as stated on many blogs and fan sites on the web) and they start throwing objects at the band and harassing them.

Hemingway then comes in and tells the mob "Give the boys a break. Everybody changes. I mean, look at me, I used to be tiny." The fans then agree and the band continues to play as the fans, the breakdancing mailmen and cat ladies all dance along to have a party. Suddenly, the dance ends when Pete falls over, knocking Hemingway out of his dream and causing him to jump off the couch and end the video.

== Track listings ==
All lyrics were written by Pete Wentz. All music was composed by Fall Out Boy.

European and Australian CD single

1. ""The Take Over, the Breaks Over""
2. "Thriller" (live from AOL Music Sessions)

European 7-inch single

1. ""The Take Over, the Breaks Over"" (album version)
2. "Sugar, We're Goin Down" (live from AOL Music Sessions)

== Personnel ==
Personnel are taken from Infinity on High CD booklet.

Fall Out Boy

- Andy Hurley
- Patrick Stump
- Joe Trohman
- Pete Wentz

Guest musicians

- Ryan Ross – guitar solo
- Chad Gilbert – guitar solo

Production

- Neal Avron – production, recording, mixing
- Erich Talaba – additional engineering
- Zeph Sowers – recording assistant
- George Gumbs – mixing assistant
- Ted Jensen – mastering

== Charts ==
=== Weekly charts ===
Chart (2007)	Peak position
Australia (ARIA)	17
New Zealand (Recorded Music NZ)	30
Scottish Singles Sales (Official Charts)	18
UK Singles (Official Charts)	48

=== Year-end charts ===
Chart (2007)	Position
Australia (ARIA)	90

== Certifications ==
Region	Certification	Certified units/sales
New Zealand (RMNZ)	Gold	15,000^{‡}
United Kingdom (BPI)	Silver	200,000^{‡}
United States (RIAA)	Gold	500,000^{‡}
^{‡} Sales+streaming figures based on certification alone.

== Release history ==
Region	Date	Format	Label	Ref.
United Kingdom	July 2, 2007	CD	Mercury	
United States	August 6, 2007	Modern rock radio	Island	
Australia	September 24, 2007	CD	Mercury	
