= I'm Like a Lawyer with the Way I'm Always Trying to Get You Off (Me & You) =

2007 single by Fall Out Boy

Single by Fall Out Boy

from the album Infinity on High
- Released: September 11, 2007
- Studio: Brandon's Way Recording (Los Angeles)
- Length: 3:31
- Label: Island
- Composers: Pete Wentz; Patrick Stump; Joe Trohman; Andy Hurley
- Lyricist: Pete Wentz
- Producer: Babyface

Fall Out Boy singles chronology
""The Take Over, the Breaks Over"" (2007)	"I'm Like a Lawyer with the Way I'm Always Trying to Get You Off (Me & You)" (2007)	"Beat It" (2008)

"I'm Like a Lawyer with the Way I'm Always Trying to Get You Off (Me & You)", or for short "I'm Like a Lawyer... (Me & You)", is a song by American rock band Fall Out Boy, released as the fifth and last single from their third studio album, Infinity on High (2007), in September 2007.

== Background ==
With music composed by Fall Out Boy vocalist and guitarist Patrick Stump and lyrics penned by bassist Pete Wentz, the song was one of the two tracks produced by Babyface (who was referenced in the song), the other single being "Thnks fr th Mmrs".

This song was played on VH1's V-Spot acoustic sessions along with "Thnks fr th Mmrs", "This Ain't a Scene, It's an Arms Race", and "Sugar, We're Goin Down", all of which were successful singles. Wentz characterized Stump’s vocal performance on the song as "straight-up Motown", continuing to say "If there wasn't a rock band playing, it'd be straight R&B, and he'd go on tour with just an upright bass and a drum and open up for R. Kelly." Lyrically, the song has been described as "about as close to a love song as you'll get from this band, a rare moment of tenderness among songs about blog entries, guest lists, and therapy sessions."

In Australia, the single reached No. 28 on the Australian ARIA singles chart, becoming the fourth consecutive top-30 single from the album in that region. In the US, it reached No. 68 on the Billboard Hot 100 and received moderate mainstream airplay.

== Critical reception ==
As the band collaborated with longtime R&B producer Babyface, initial reviews of the song and its breach into another genre were mixed. Corey Apar, a writer for Allmusic, was more malignant towards the song, calling it Maroon 5-ish, with "a vocal hook uncomfortably close to Phil Collins' cover of "A Groovy Kind of Love". On the contrary, Rolling Stone magazine lauded the song, and IGN approved of the song, assuring long-time fans that they indeed had nothing to fear about the band permanently branching into R&B.

== Music video ==
In an interview with MSNBC, bassist Pete Wentz told Chicagoan/Today Staffer Devin Johnson, that the band was to film the video for the song in Uganda, and further noted, "...we're going to shoot it on 24p cameras and donate the money that we were going to use in the video for the film or the video to a project over there..." According to Billboard, the band shot the video for the single after having performed their first show in South Africa. The music video was directed by Alan Ferguson. A sneak peek of the video aired on TRL on September 12, and the music video for "Me + You" can now be seen in its entirety on AOL.com. FUSE TV premiered the video on September 14.

Fall Out Boy decided to film the music video in Uganda after hearing of the organization Invisible Children, Inc. The band originally intended to create a documentary-style film, but decided to focus on a love story between two Ugandan children, opining that the treatment "seemed a lot more dangerous and compelling. I mean, have you ever seen a love story between Ugandan people — especially with a rock band — on 'TRL'?" Invisible Children co-founder Bobby Bailey referred to the video as "groundbreaking".

A clip of the video showed the band performing in a field in Uganda between shots of people doing their daily routines in Africa and a group of people watching the video band's previous music video for their song "Dance, Dance".

The plot focuses on the lives of two children from Uganda who fall in love and work hard to be able to go to school. One night, their village is raided, and the young boy is taken. However, in a portion with no music, the boy escapes. As the boy returns home, the music starts playing again and the two reunite. The video ends with a message saying that there are still thousands of children soldiers who have not returned to their families, along with the URL to Invisible Children Inc.'s official website. In this video, apart from the scenes with the children, there are only a few shots of the band, far fewer than in prior videos.

== Track listing ==
Lyrics were written by bassist and backing vocalist Pete Wentz; music was composed by Fall Out Boy.

1. "I'm Like a Lawyer with the Way I'm Always Trying to Get You Off (Me & You)" – 3:35
2. "This Ain't a Scene, It's an Arms Race" (Live from Hammersmith Palais) – 3:24

== Personnel ==
Personnel taken from Infinity on High CD booklet.

Fall Out Boy

- Andy Hurley
- Patrick Stump
- Joe Trohman
- Pete Wentz

Additional personnel

- Babyface – production, B3 organ
- Paul Boutin – recording
- Tom Lord-Alge – mixing
- Ted Jensen – mastering

== Charts ==
Chart (2007–2008)	Peak position
Australia (ARIA)	28
New Zealand (Recorded Music NZ)	33
Scottish Singles Sales (Official Charts)	45
Slovakia Airplay (ČNS IFPI)	22
UK Singles (Official Charts)	91
US Billboard Hot 100	68
US Pop Airplay (Billboard)	24
US Pop 100 (Billboard)	31
Venezuela Pop Rock (Record Report)	6

== Certifications ==
Region	Certification	Certified units/sales
United States (RIAA)	Gold	500,000^{‡}
^{‡} Sales+streaming figures based on certification alone.

== Release history ==
Region	Date	Format(s)	Label	Ref.
United States	September 11, 2007	Contemporary hit radio	Island	
United Kingdom	September 17, 2007	Digital download; CD single	Mercury	
Australia	February 4, 2008	CD single	Universal	
