= Beat It =

1983 single by Michael Jackson

- Artwork for continental European editions

Single by Michael Jackson

from the album Thriller
- B-side: "Get on the Floor"
- Released: February 21, 1983
- Recorded: October 1982
- Studio: Westlake (Los Angeles, California); Hayvenhurst (Encino, California)
- Genre: Hard rock; dance-rock; funk rock
- Length: 4:18
- Label: Epic
- Songwriter: Michael Jackson
- Producer: Quincy Jones

Michael Jackson singles chronology
"Billie Jean" (1983)	"Beat It" (1983)	"Wanna Be Startin'Somethin'" (1983)

Music video
- "Beat It" on YouTube

Alternative cover
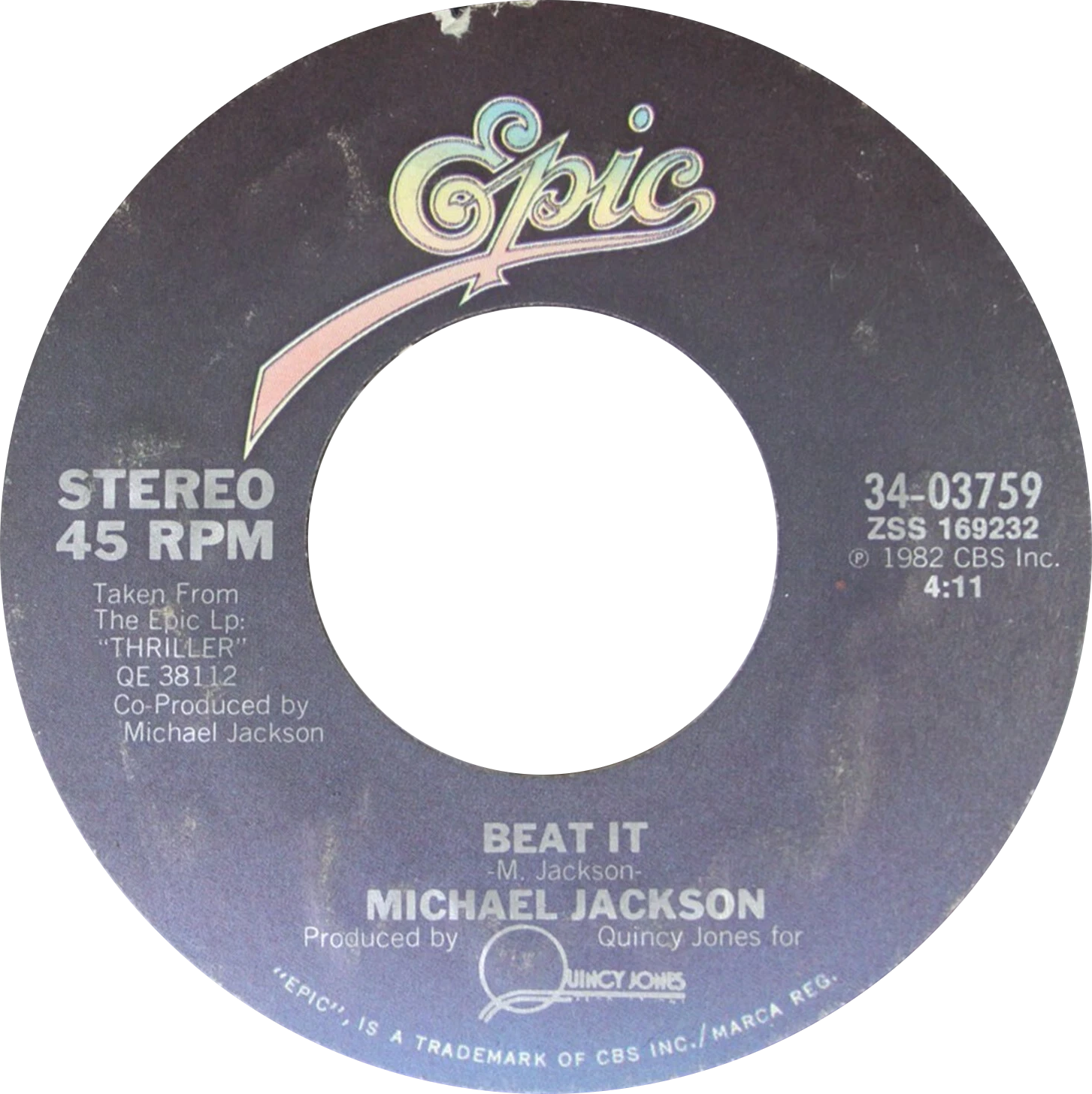
- Side A of the US single

Audio sample
- file; help

"Beat It" is a song by American singer Michael Jackson from his sixth studio album, Thriller (1982). It was written and composed by Jackson, produced by Quincy Jones, and co-produced by Jackson. Jones encouraged Jackson to include a rock song similar to "My Sharona" on the album. Jackson later said: "I wanted to write a song, the type of song that I would buy if I were to buy a rock song... And I wanted the children to really enjoy it — the school children as well as the college students." It includes a guitar solo by Eddie Van Halen.

Following the successful Thriller singles "The Girl Is Mine" and "Billie Jean", "Beat It" was released on February 21, 1983, as the album's third single. It peaked at number one on the Billboard Hot 100, staying there for three weeks. It also charted at number one on the Billboard Hot Black Singles chart. Billboard ranked the song No. 5 for 1983. It is certified 8× platinum by the Recording Industry Association of America (RIAA). "Beat It" was a number one hit in Europe, reaching number one in Spain, Belgium and the Netherlands. With sales of over 10 million worldwide, "Beat It" is one of the best-selling songs of all time.

The song's music video, which stars members of Los Angeles-based street gangs, the Crips and the Bloods, at the height of their rivalry, helped establish Jackson as an international pop icon. The single, along with its music video, helped make Thriller the best-selling album of all time. "Beat It" has been cited as one of the most successful, recognized, awarded and celebrated songs in the history of popular music; both the song and video had a large impact on pop culture.

"Beat It" won the 1984 Grammy Awards for Record of the Year and Best Male Rock Vocal Performance, as well as two American Music Awards. It was inducted into the Music Video Producers Hall of Fame. Rolling Stone ranked "Beat It" number 337 on its list of The 500 Greatest Songs of All Time in 2004, and at number 185 in its 2021 update of the list. The magazine also named it the 81st greatest guitar song of all time. It was included in the Rock and Roll Hall of Fame's 500 Songs That Shaped Rock and Roll.

== Production and composition ==
Jackson first worked on a demo version of the song with musicians at his home studio. The drum part was programmed on a drum machine, and the bass line was a combination of electric bass guitar and Bell Labs Digital Synthesizer Synergy keyboard. This hybrid bass style was retained for the main recording session.

Sheet music for the song is in the key of E♭ Minor in standard time, with a moderately fast tempo of 135–140 beats per minute. Jackson's vocal range is B♭_{3} to A♭_{5}.

Upon hearing the first recorded vocals, Jones stated that it was exactly what he was looking for. The song begins with seven distinct synthesizer notes played on the Synclavier digital synthesizer, with Tom Bahler credited for the Synclavier performance on the song. The intro is taken note for note from a demo LP released the year before, called "The Incredible Sounds of Synclavier II" first published in 1981 by Denny Jaeger Creative Services, Inc., and sold by New England Digital, makers of the Synclavier. The drums were played by Toto co-founder Jeff Porcaro. Steve Porcaro and Steve Lukather, also Toto members, participate with synthesizers, and guitar and bass guitar respectively. Michael's older brother and fellow the Jacksons bandmate at the time Tito Jackson originally contributed a guitar solo, which was scrapped when Eddie Van Halen was called to perform the solo instead.

Jermaine Jackson has suggested the inspiration of "Beat It" and its video came from the Jackson family experiencing gang activity in Gary, Indiana. "From our front window, we witnessed, about three bad rumbles between rival gangs." The lyrics of "Beat It" have been described as a "sad commentary on human nature". The line "don't be a macho man" is said to express Jackson's dislike of violence, while also referring to the childhood abuse he faced at the hands of his father Joe.

=== Eddie Van Halen's guitar solo ===
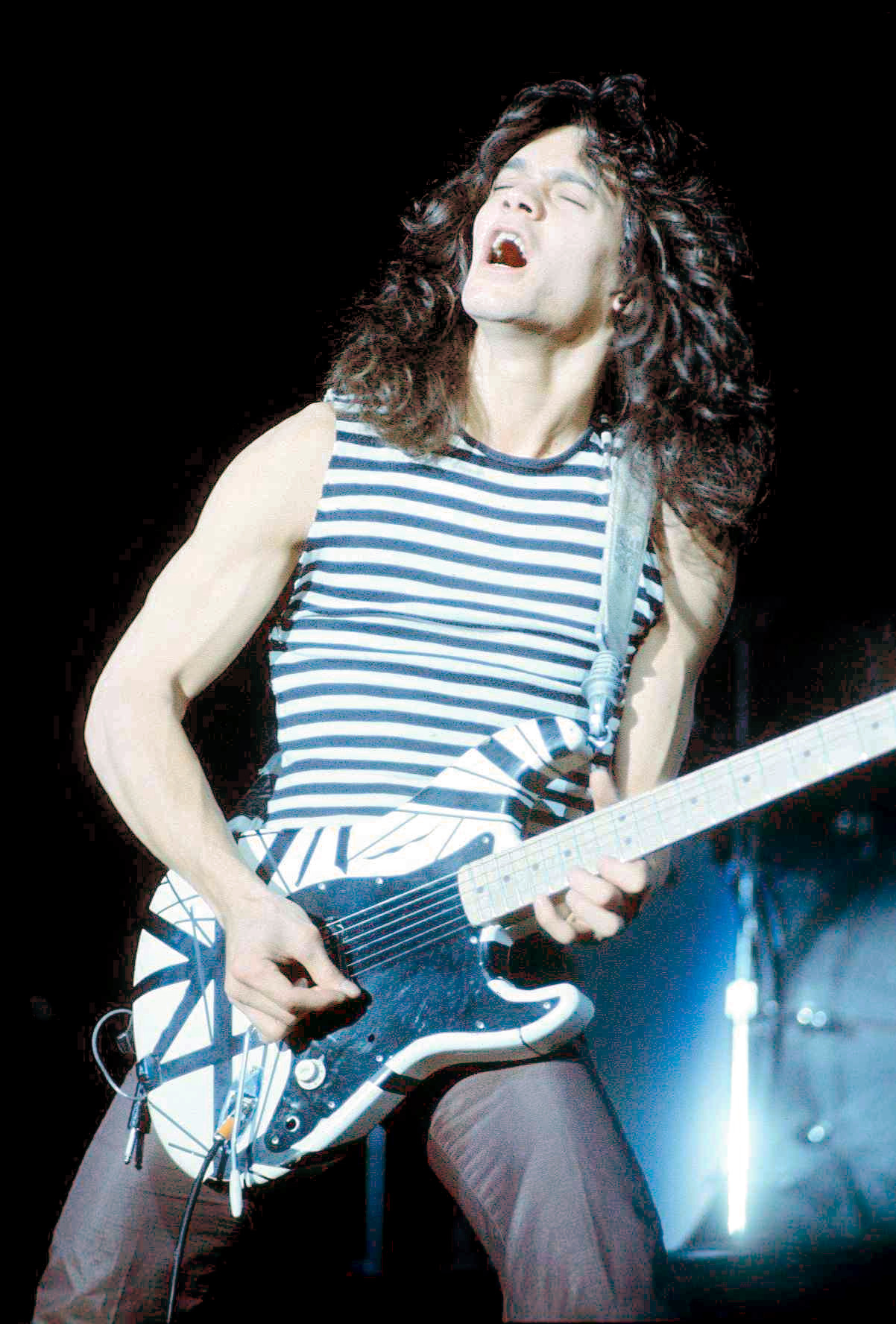
Eddie Van Halen performing in 1978

Eddie Van Halen, lead guitarist of hard rock band Van Halen, was asked to add a guitar solo. When initially contacted by Jones, Van Halen thought he was receiving a prank call. Having established that the call was genuine, Van Halen used a rented Marshall amplifier, set up to use alongside his Frankenstrat guitar and an Echoplex, then recorded two takes of the solo free of charge. "I did it as a favor", the musician later said. "I was a complete fool, according to the rest of the band, our manager and everyone else. I was not used. I knew what I was doing—I don't do something unless I want to do it." Van Halen reported in 2015 that he also helped rearrange the song: they wanted him to solo over the chorus, but he suggested doing the solo over the verse section instead with the chord change underneath, which he felt worked better. The edits made based on this, however, interfered with the SMPTE timecode on the multitrack reel needed to synchronise with other multitrack reels for the complete song. Thus, guitarist Steve Lukather and drummer Jeff Porcaro had to re-cut the basic tracks of the song to fit around Jackson's lead vocal and the guitar solo with the help of engineer Humberto Gatica. Lukather recalled, "Initially, we rocked it out as Eddie had played a good solo—but Quincy thought it was too tough. So I had to reduce the distorted guitar sound and that is what was released."

Right before the guitar solo begins, a noise is heard that sounds like somebody knocking at a door. It is reported that the knock was a person walking into Van Halen's recording studio, while another story has claimed that the sound was simply Van Halen knocking on his own guitar.

It was reported that during the marathon mixing sessions, the engineers were shocked while working on Van Halen's solo to discover that the sound of his guitar caused the monitor speaker in the control room to catch fire, allegedly causing "Thriller" songwriter Rod Temperton to exclaim, "This must be really good!" In an interview in 2016, this was confirmed to be an urban legend. Following Jackson's death in 2009, Van Halen described working with him as "one of [the] fondest memories in [his] career".

== Release and reception ==
"The uncredited guitarist who whipped out the fluttering, squealing solo on this ode to macho cowardice was Eddie Van Halen. The aerodynamic metal flight pumped crossover fuel that would boost the success of Thriller—a gimmick Jackson would flog later with spots from Slash and Carlos Santana. Without the Van Halen precedent, there might have been no collaboration of Run-DMC and Aerosmith on the 1986 rap/rock version of 'Walk This Way'."

— Greg Burk, South Coast Today.

"Beat It" was released in early 1983 to widespread acclaim, following the successful chart performances of "The Girl Is Mine" and "Billie Jean". Frank DiLeo, the vice president of Epic Records, convinced Jackson to release "Beat It" while "Billie Jean" was heading towards number one. DiLeo, who later became Jackson's manager, correctly predicted that both singles would remain in the top 10 at the same time. The song reached number one on the Billboard Hot 100 on April 30, 1983. "Billie Jean" remained atop the Billboard Hot 100 for seven weeks, before being toppled by "Come On Eileen", which stayed at No. 1 for a single week, before Jackson reclaimed the position with "Beat It".

"Billie Jean" and "Beat It" occupied top 5 positions at the same time, a feat matched by very few artists. The single remained at the top of the Hot 100 for a total of three weeks. The song also charted at No. 1 on the US R&B singles chart and No. 14 on the Billboard Top Tracks chart in the US. Billboard ranked it at the No. 5 song for 1983. "Beat It" also claimed the top spot in Spain and the Netherlands, reached No. 3 in the UK and the top 20 in Austria, Norway, Italy, Sweden and Switzerland and #2 in Australia for 4 weeks while stuck behind the smash hit, "Total Eclipse of the Heart" by Bonnie Tyler.

During the week of Dec. 18, 1982, “Beat It” was one of Billboard's top three adds at rock radio alongside cuts by Sammy Hagar and Bob Seger. The song peaked at No. 14 on Billboard's rock tracks chart.

In a Rolling Stone review, Christopher Connelly describes "Beat It" as "maybe the best song" on Thriller, adding that it is "a this-ain't-no-disco AOR track if ever I heard one". He notes of the "nifty dance song", "Jackson's voice soars all over the melody, Eddie Van Halen checks in with a blistering guitar solo, you could build a convention center on the backbeat". AllMusic's Stephen Thomas Erlewine states that the song is both "tough" and "scared". Robert Christgau claimed that the song has Eddie Van Halen "wielding his might in the service of antimacho". Slant Magazine observed that the song was an "uncharacteristic dalliance with the rock idiom". The track also won praise from Jackson biographer J. Randy Taraborrelli, who stated that the song was "rambunctious".

"Beat It" has been recognized with several awards. At the 1984 Grammy Awards, the song earned Jackson two of record-eight awards: Record of the Year and Best Male Rock Vocal Performance. The track won the Billboard Music Award for favorite dance/disco 12" LP in 1983. The single was certified gold by the Recording Industry Association of America (RIAA), a few months after its release, for shipments of at least one million units. In 1989, the standard format single was re-certified platinum by the RIAA, based on the revised sales level of one million units for platinum singles. The total number of digital sales in the US, as of August 2022, stands at 8,000,000.

== Music video ==
Jackson during a dance step in the music video for "Beat It"

The music video for "Beat It" helped establish Jackson as an international pop icon. The video was Jackson's first treatment of black youth and the streets. Both "Beat It" and "Thriller" are notable for their "mass choreography" of synchronized dancers, a Jackson trademark.

The video, which cost Jackson $150,000 to create after CBS refused to finance it, was filmed on Los Angeles' Skid Row—mainly on locations on East 5th Street—around March 9, 1983. To add authenticity to the production but also to foster peace between them, Jackson had the idea to cast members of rival Los Angeles street gangs Crips and Bloods. In addition to around 80 genuine gang members, the video, which is noted for opening up many job opportunities for dancers in the US, also featured 18 professional dancers and four breakdancers. Besides Jackson, Michael Peters, and Vincent Paterson, the cast included Michael DeLorenzo, Stoney Jackson, Tracii Guns, Tony Fields, Peter Tram, Rick Stone and Cheryl Song. The bar location shown in the latter part of the first minute of the video was also featured 13 years earlier in the gatefold and on the back cover of the Doors 1970 album, Morrison Hotel. Coincidentally, the name of that skid row bar, the Hard Rock Café, was also the inspiration for the London original of the famous chain of restaurants begun in 1971.

The video was written and directed by Bob Giraldi and produced by Ralph Cohen, Antony Payne and Mary M. Ensign through the production company GASP. The second video released for the Thriller album, it was choreographed by Peters who also performed, alongside Vincent Paterson, as one of the two lead dancers. Despite some sources claiming otherwise, Jackson was involved in creating some parts of the choreography. Jackson asked Giraldi, at the time already an established commercial director but who had never directed a music video, to come up with a concept for the "Beat It" video because he really liked a commercial Giraldi had directed for WLS-TV in Chicago about a married couple of two elderly blind people who instead of running from a run-down neighborhood all the other white people had fled from, chose to stay and throw a block party for all the young children in the area. Contrary to popular belief, the concept of the video was not based on the Broadway musical West Side Story; in reality, Giraldi drew inspiration from his growing up in Paterson, New Jersey.

The video had its world premiere on MTV during prime time on March 31, 1983; neither "Beat It" nor "Billie Jean" were, as is often claimed, the first music video by an African-American artist to be played on MTV. Soon after its premiere the video was also running on other video programs including BET's Video Soul, SuperStation WTBS's Night Tracks, and NBC's Friday Night Videos. In fact, "Beat It" was the first video shown on the latter's first ever telecast on July 29, 1983.

The video opens with the news of a fight circulating at a diner. This scene repeats itself at a billiards hall, where gang members arrive and the song begins to play. The camera cuts to Jackson lying on a bed as he contemplates the senseless violence. Jackson dons a red leather J. Parks brand jacket and dances his way towards the fight through the diner and the billiards hall. A knife fight is taking place between the two gang leaders in a warehouse. They dance battle for an interlude of music until Jackson arrives; he breaks up the fight and launches into a dance routine. The video ends with the gang members joining him in the dance, agreeing that violence is not the solution to their problems. During the second take of filming that sequence, Giraldi instructed the assistant director to quietly replace his real switchblade with a rubber one, which allowed him to capture the dancers backing away from the knives because "they were really afraid."

The video received recognition through numerous awards. The American Music Awards named the short film their Favorite Pop/Rock Video and their Favorite Soul Video. The Black Gold Awards honored Jackson with the Best Video Performance award. The Billboard Video Awards recognized the video with 7 awards; Best Overall Video Clip, Best Performance by a Male Artist, Best Use of Video to Enhance a Song, Best Use of Video to Enhance an Artist's Image, Best Choreography, Best Overall Video and Best Dance/Disco 12". The short film was ranked by Rolling Stone as the No. 1 video, in both their critic's and reader's polls. The video was later inducted into the Music Video Producer's Hall of Fame.

In November 2023, the music video reached 1 billion views on YouTube. It was Jackson's third music video (after "Billie Jean" and "They Don't Care About Us") to achieve this milestone.

The music video of the song appears on the video albums: Video Greatest Hits – HIStory, HIStory on Film, Volume II, Number Ones, on the bonus DVD of Thriller 25 and Michael Jackson's Vision.

== Live performances ==
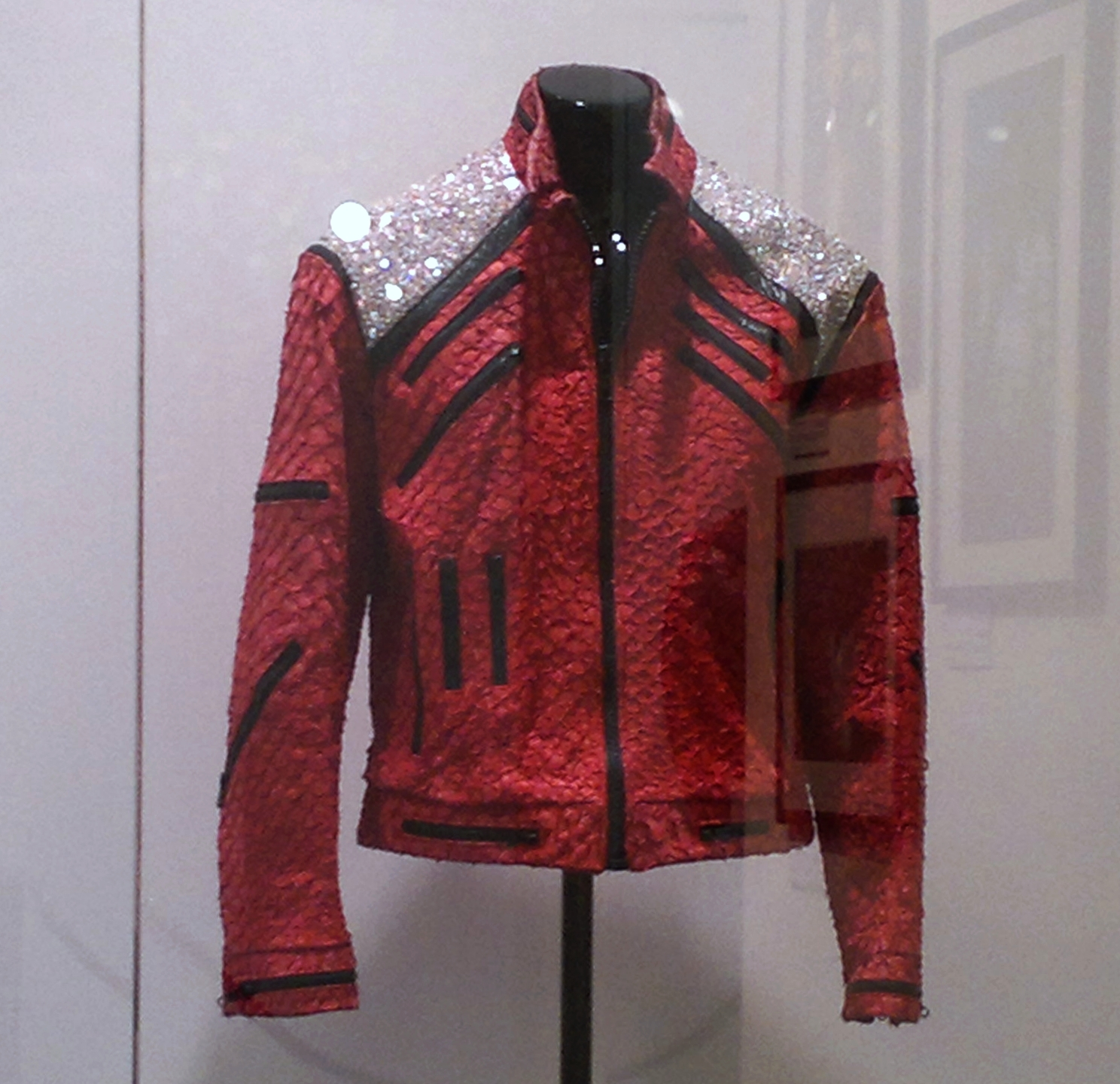
Jackson's "Beat It" jacket worn for the Dangerous World Tour

Jackson performed "Beat It" live with his brothers during the Jacksons' Victory Tour. On July 13, 1984, the brothers were joined on stage by Eddie Van Halen, who played the guitar in his solo spot. The song became one of Jackson's signature songs; he performed it on all of his world tours: Bad, Dangerous and HIStory. The October 1, 1992 Dangerous Tour performance, including "Beat It", was included in the Michael Jackson: The Ultimate Collection box set. The DVD was later repackaged as Live in Bucharest: The Dangerous Tour. Jackson also performed the song on the Michael Jackson: 30th Anniversary Special, a concert celebrating the musician's thirtieth year as a solo performer. The performance featured Slash as the song's guest guitarist.

== Legacy ==
Jackson's "Beat It" has been cited as one of the most successful, recognized, awarded, and celebrated songs in the history of pop music; both the song and video had a large impact on pop culture. The song is said to be a "pioneer" in black rock music and is considered one of the cornerstones of the Thriller album. Eddie Van Halen has been praised for adding "the greatest guitar solo", helping "Beat It" become one of the best-selling singles of all time.

Shortly after its release, "Beat It" was included in the National Highway Safety Commission's anti-drunk driving campaign, "Drinking and Driving Can Kill a Friendship". The song was also included on the accompanying album. Jackson collected an award from President Ronald Reagan at the White House, in recognition for his support of the campaign. Reagan stated that Jackson was "proof of what a person can accomplish through a lifestyle free of alcohol or drug abuse. People young and old respect that. And if Americans follow his example, then we can face up to the problem of drinking and driving, and we can, in Michael's words, 'Beat It'."

Frequently listed in greatest song polling lists, "Beat It" was ranked as the world's fourth favorite song in a 2005 poll conducted by Sony Ericsson. Over 700,000 people in 60 countries cast their votes. Voters from the UK placed "Billie Jean" at No. 1, ahead of "Thriller", with a further five of the top ten being solo recordings by Jackson. Rolling Stone placed "Beat It" at number 337 on its list of the 500 Greatest Songs in 2004, and at number 185 in its 2021 update of the list. The song was featured in the films Back to the Future Part II, Zoolander and Undercover Brother. When re-released, as part of the Visionary campaign in 2006, "Beat It" charted at No. 15 in the UK.The song was featured in The Flintstone Kids while it was performed by La Toya Jackson but as a parody with "Beat it say no" to drugs.

A remix of "2 Bad", is featured on Blood on the Dance Floor: HIStory in the Mix containing a sample of "Beat It" as well as a rap by John Forté and guitar solo by Wyclef Jean.

== Format and track listing ==
7" vinyl single – US (Epic 34-03759)
No.	Title	Writer(s)	Length
1.	"Beat It"	Michael Jackson	4:18
2.	"Get on the Floor"	Jackson, Louis Johnson	4:44

12" vinyl single – UK (Epic TA 3258)
No.	Title	Writer(s)	Length
1.	"Beat It"	Jackson	4:11
2.	"Burn This Disco Out"	Rod Temperton	3:38
3.	"The Jacksons – Don't Stop 'til You Get Enough" (live version)	Greg Phillinganes, Jackson	4:22

Visionary single 2006
No.	Title	Writer(s)	Length
1.	"Beat It"	Jackson	4:18
2.	"Beat It" (Moby's Sub Remix)	Jackson	6:11

Visionary single DVD
No.	Title	Writer(s)	Length
1.	"Beat It" (video)	Jackson	4:56

== Credits and personnel ==
Adapted from the Thriller 25 liner notes.

Performers

- Michael Jackson – lead and backing vocals, drum case beater
- Paul Jackson Jr. – rhythm guitar
- Steve Lukather – lead guitar, bass guitar
- Eddie Van Halen – guitar solo
- Steve Porcaro – synthesizer, synthesizer programming
- Greg Phillinganes – Rhodes piano, synthesizer
- Bill Wolfer – keyboards
- Tom Bahler – Synclavier
- Jeff Porcaro – drums
- Greg Smith – Synergy synthesizer
- Chris Shepard – vibraslap

Production

- Michael Jackson – songwriting, co-production, rhythm and vocal arrangement
- Quincy Jones – production, rhythm arrangement

== Charts ==
=== Weekly charts ===
Weekly chart performance
Chart (1983–1984)	Peak position
Australia (Kent Music Report)	2
Austria (Ö3 Austria Top 40)	6
Belgium (Ultratop 50 Flanders)	1
Canada (The Record)	1
Canada Top Singles (RPM)	1
Europe (Eurochart Hot 100)	1
Finland (Suomen virallinen singlelista)	12
Finland Jukebox (Suomen virallinen lista)	10
France (IFOP)	2
Germany (GfK)	2
Ireland (IRMA)	2
Italy (Musica e dischi)	16
Mexico (AMPROFON)	5
Netherlands (Dutch Top 40)	1
Netherlands (Single Top 100)	1
New Zealand (Recorded Music NZ)	1
Norway (VG-lista)	8
Peru (UPI)	8
South Africa (Springbok Radio)	8
Sweden (Sverigetopplistan)	19
Switzerland (Schweizer Hitparade)	2
UK Singles (Official Charts)	3
US Billboard Hot 100	1
US Billboard Hot Black Singles	1
US Billboard Mainstream Rock	14
US Cash Box Top 100	1
Chart (2006–2026)	Peak position
Argentina Hot 100 (Billboard)	42
Australia (ARIA)	17
Austria (Ö3 Austria Top 40)	10
Belgium (Ultratop 50 Wallonia)	45
Bolivia (Billboard)	7
Brazil Hot 100 (Billboard)	34
Canada (Hot Canadian Digital Singles)	11
Chile (Billboard)	13
Colombia Hot 100 (Billboard)	49
Costa Rica Streaming (FONOTICA)	16
Croatia International Airplay (Top lista)	62
Czech Republic Singles Digital (ČNS IFPI)	18
Denmark (Tracklisten)	16
Ecuador (Billboard)	5
Ecuador Streaming (Promúsica)	6
Europe (Eurochart Hot 100 Singles)	17
Finland (Suomen virallinen lista)	12
France (SNEP)	8
Germany (GfK)	9
Global 200 (Billboard)	5
Greece International (IFPI)	4
Hungary (Single Top 40)	36
Iceland (Billboard)	5
India International (IMI)	2
Israel (Mako Hitlist)	63
Italy (FIMI)	12
Japan Hot 100 (Billboard)	24
Latvia Airplay (LaIPA)	14
Latvia Streaming (LaIPA)	14
Lithuania (AGATA)	23
Luxembourg (Billboard)	5
Middle East and North Africa (IFPI)	8
Netherlands (Single Top 100)	7
New Zealand (Recorded Music NZ)	10
Norway (VG-lista)	8
Panama Streaming (PRODUCE)	35
Peru Streaming (Promúsica)	5
Poland Airplay (ZPAV)	67
Poland (Polish Streaming Top 100)	42
Portugal (AFP)	18
Romania (Billboard)	18
Slovakia Singles Digital (ČNS IFPI)	8
Spain (Promusicae)	1
Sweden (Sverigetopplistan)	10
Switzerland (Schweizer Hitparade)	1
Turkey (Türkiye Top 20)	14
United Arab Emirates (IFPI)	4
UK Singles (Official Charts)	5
US Billboard Hot Digital Songs	7

=== Monthly charts ===
Monthly chart performance
Chart (2026)	Position
Brazil Streaming (Pro-Música Brasil)	32
Panama Streaming (PRODUCE)	37

=== Year-end charts ===
Year-end chart performance
Chart (1983)	Position
Australia (Kent Music Report)	9
Belgium (Ultratop 50 Flanders)	3
Canada Top Singles (RPM)	8
France (IFOP)	5
Germany (Official German Charts)	30
Netherlands (Dutch Top 40)	3
Netherlands (Single Top 100)	7
New Zealand (Recorded Music NZ)	3
US Billboard Hot 100	5
US Hot Black Singles (Billboard)	14
US Cash Box Top 100	7
Chart (2009)	Position
Sweden (Sverigetopplistan)	62
Switzerland (Schweizer Hitparade)	92
UK Singles (Official Charts Company)	178

== Certifications ==
Certifications
Region	Certification	Certified units/sales
Australia (ARIA)	Platinum	70,000^{^}
Canada (Music Canada)	6× Platinum	480,000^{‡}
Denmark (IFPI Danmark)	2× Platinum	180,000^{‡}
France (SNEP)	Platinum	1,000,000^{*}
Germany (BVMI)	3× Gold	900,000^{‡}
Italy (FIMI)	Platinum	100,000^{‡}
Japan (RIAJ)	Platinum	250,000^{*}
Mexico (AMPROFON)	2× Diamond+4× Platinum	840,000^{‡}
Netherlands (NVPI)	Gold	100,000^{^}
New Zealand (RMNZ)	5× Platinum	150,000^{‡}
Portugal (AFP)	2× Platinum	50,000^{‡}
Spain (Promusicae)	Platinum	100,000^{‡}
United Kingdom (BPI)	4× Platinum	2,400,000^{‡}
United States (RIAA)	8× Platinum	8,000,000^{‡}
United States (RIAA) Mastertone	Gold	500,000^{*}
Streaming
Greece (IFPI Greece)	2× Platinum	4,000,000^{†}
^{*} Sales figures based on certification alone.^{^} Shipments figures based on certification alone.^{‡} Sales+streaming figures based on certification alone.^{†} Streaming-only figures based on certification alone.

== Beat It 2008 ==
"Beat It 2008"

Song by Michael Jackson featuring Fergie

from the album Thriller 25
- Released: April 7, 2008
- Length: 4:12
- Label: Epic
- Songwriter: Michael Jackson
- Producers: Michael Jackson; will.i.am

For Thriller 25, Black Eyed Peas singer will.i.am remixed "Beat It". The song, titled "Beat It 2008", featured additional vocals by fellow Black Eyed Peas member Fergie. Upon its release in 2008, the song reached No. 26 in Switzerland, the top 50 in Sweden and No. 65 in Austria. This was the second remixed version of "Beat It" to get an official release, following "Moby's Sub Mix" which was released on the "Jam" and "Who Is It" singles in 1992, as well as the "They Don't Care About Us" single in 1996 (and re-released as part of the Visionary campaign).

=== Reception ===
"Beat It 2008" received generally unfavorable reviews from music critics. Rob Sheffield of Rolling Stone claimed that the song was a "contender for the year's most pointless musical moment". AllMusic criticized Fergie for "parroting the lyrics of "Beat It" back to a recorded Jackson". Blender's Kelefa Sanneh also noted that the Black Eyed Peas singer traded lines with Jackson. "Why?", she queried. Todd Gilchrist was thankful that the remix retained Eddie Van Halen's "incendiary guitar solo", but added that the song "holds the dubious honor of making Jackson seem masculine for once, and only in the context of Fergie's tough-by-way-of-Kids Incorporated interpretation of the tune". Tom Ewing of Pitchfork observed that Fergie's "nervous reverence is a waste of time".

=== Charts ===
==== Weekly charts ====
2008 weekly chart performance for "Beat It 2008"
Chart (2008)	Peak position
Austria (Ö3 Austria Top 40)	65
Canada (Hot Canadian Digital Singles)	66
Sweden (Sverigetopplistan)	43
Switzerland (Schweizer Hitparade)	26

2009 weekly chart performance for "Beat It 2008"
Chart (2009)	Peak position
Austria (Ö3 Austria Top 40)	14
Sweden (Sverigetopplistan)	8

2026 weekly chart performance
Chart (2026)	Peak position
Russia Streaming (TopHit)	61

=== Monthly charts ===
Monthly chart performance
Chart (2026)	Position
Russia Streaming (TopHit)	66

== Fall Out Boy version ==
"Beat It"

Single by Fall Out Boy featuring John Mayer

from the album Live in Phoenix
- Released: March 25, 2008
- Recorded: 2008
- Genre: Hard rock
- Length: 3:48
- Label: Island
- Songwriter: Michael Jackson
- Producer: Patrick Stump

Fall Out Boy singles chronology
"I'm Like a Lawyer (Me & You)" (2007)	"Beat It" (2008)	"'I Don't Care" (2008)

John Mayer singles chronology
"Say" (2007)	"Beat It" (2008)	"Free Fallin'" (2008)

Music video
- "Beat It (MTV Version) ft. John Mayer " on YouTube

American rock band Fall Out Boy covered "Beat It". The studio version was digitally released on March 25, 2008, by Island Records as the only single from the band's first live album, Live in Phoenix (2008). The guitar solo is played by John Mayer. In the United States, the song peaked at No. 19 on the Billboard Hot 100 and reached No. 21 on the defunct-Billboard Pop 100 chart, also charting internationally. The band has since regularly incorporated it in their set list at their shows.

=== Background, recording and release ===
In early 2008, it was announced that Fall Out Boy were to cover "Beat It" for their Live in Phoenix album. The band had previously performed the song at venues such as Coors Amphitheatre and festivals such as the Carling Weekend in Leeds. Bassist Pete Wentz, who has claimed to have an obsession with Jackson, stated that prior to recording the song, he would only watch Moonwalker. It was also announced that John Mayer was to add the guitar solo previously played by Eddie Van Halen.

The band's lead singer/guitarist Patrick Stump stated that the band had not planned to cover the song. "Basically, I just started playing the riff in sound-check one day, and then we all started playing it, and then we started playing it live, and then we figured we'd record it and put it out with our live DVD." Bassist Pete Wentz added that the band had not originally intended for the song to be released as a single either. "'Beat It' seemed like a song that would be cool and that we could do our own take on," he said. Having spent time deciding on a guitarist for the song, Wentz eventually called John Mayer to add the guitar solo. "We were trying to think about who is a contemporary guitar guy who's going to go down as a legend," Wentz later noted.

Upon its digital release as a single in April 2008, Fall Out Boy's cover of "Beat It" became a mainstay on iTunes' Top 10 chart. The song peaked at No. 8 in Canada, becoming another top 10 hit in the region. It also charted at No. 13 in Australia, No. 14 in New Zealand, No. 75 in Austria and No. 98 in the Netherlands.

=== Music video ===
The music video for Fall Out Boy's "Beat It" was directed by Shane Drake and was made in homage to Jackson. "I think when you're doing a Michael Jackson cover, there's this expectation that you're going to do one of his videos verbatim," Stump said. "What we decided to do was kind of inspired by Michael Jackson and the mythology of him. There are specific images that are reference points for us, but at any given point, it's not any of his videos. It's kind of all of his videos, all at once, but on a Fall Out Boy budget, so it's not quite as fancy." The costumes for the video were similar to the originals. "My costume is this take on one of the guys from Michael Jackson's original 'Beat It' video, like, the guy who plays the rival dancer," Wentz said during the filming of the video. The music video featured numerous cameos, including a karate class/dance session being taught by Tony Hale, Donald Faison, Joel David Moore and Hal Sparks dressed up like Michael Jackson. The short film later received a MTV Video Music Award nomination for Best Rock Video.

=== Charts ===
==== Weekly charts ====
Weekly chart performance
Chart (2008)	Peak position
Australia (ARIA)	13
Austria (Ö3 Austria Top 40)	75
Belgium (Ultratip Bubbling Under Wallonia)	12
Canada Hot 100 (Billboard)	8
Canada CHR/Top 40 (Billboard)	50
Canada (Hot Canadian Digital Singles)	4
Finland Download (Latauslista)	27
Ireland (IRMA)	21
Germany (GfK)	69
Hungary (Rádiós Top 40)	7
Netherlands (Single Top 100)	98
New Zealand (Recorded Music NZ)	14
UK Singles (Official Charts)	21
US Billboard Hot 100	19
US Pop 100 (Billboard)	4
Venezuela Pop Rock (Record Report)	9

==== Year-end charts ====
Year-end chart performance
Chart (2008)	Position
Australia (ARIA)	94
Hungary (Rádiós Top 40)	35

=== Certifications ===
Certifications for "Beat It" by Fall Out Boy
Region	Certification	Certified units/sales
Brazil (Pro-Música Brasil)	Gold	30,000^{‡}
United Kingdom (BPI)	Silver	200,000^{‡}
United States (RIAA)	Platinum	1,000,000^{‡}
^{‡} Sales+streaming figures based on certification alone.

=== Release history ===
Release dates and formats for "Beat It"
Region	Date	Format	Label(s)	Ref.
United States	April 15, 2008	Mainstream airplay	Island	

== "Eat It" parody ==
In 1984, American parodist "Weird Al" Yankovic released his parody song "Eat It". Yankovic recorded the song with Jackson's permission. The song's music video followed the "Beat It" short film scene-for-scene, with Yankovic mimicking Jackson's dance moves in a clumsy fashion. Jackson received royalties as he was listed as co-writer of the song.

== See also ==
- List of best-selling singles
- List of best-selling singles in Mexico
- List of best-selling singles in the United States
- List of Top 25 singles for 1983 in Australia
- List of Billboard Hot 100 number-one singles of 1983
- Billboard Year-End Hot 100 singles of 1983
- List of number-one singles of 1983 (Canada)
- List of Cash Box Top 100 number-one singles of 1983
- List of Dutch Top 40 number-one singles of 1983
- List of European number-one hits of 1983
- List of number-one singles from the 1980s (New Zealand)
- List of number-one R&B singles of 1983 (U.S.)
- List of number-one singles of 2006 (Spain)

== Bibliography ==
- Austen, Jake (2005). TV-a-Go-Go. Chicago Review Press. ISBN 1-55652-572-9.
- Cadman, Chris; Halstead, Craig (2007). Michael Jackson: For the Record. Authors OnLine. ISBN 978-0-7552-0267-6.
- Campbell, Lisa (1993). Michael Jackson: The King of Pop. Branden. ISBN 0-8283-1957-X.
- Dean, Maury (2003). Rock 'n' Roll Gold Rush. Algora Publishing. ISBN 0-87586-207-1.
- Denisoff, R. Serge (1988). Inside MTV. Transaction Publishers. ISBN 978-0-88738-864-4.
- George, Nelson (2004). Michael Jackson: The Ultimate Collection booklet. Sony BMG.
- Halstead, Craig; Cadman, Chris (2003). Jacksons Number Ones. Authors OnLine. ISBN 978-0-7552-0098-6.
- Halstead, Craig; Cadman, Chris (2003). Michael Jackson: The Solo Years. Authors OnLine. ISBN 978-0-7552-0091-7.
- Taraborrelli, J. Randy (2004). The Magic and the Madness. Terra Alta, WV: Headline. ISBN 0-330-42005-4.
- Thriller 25: The Book. ML Publishing Group. 2008. ISBN 978-0-9768891-9-9.
- Whiteley, Sheila (2005). Too Much Too Young. Routledge. ISBN 0-415-31029-6.
