= The Carpal Tunnel of Love =

2006 single by Fall Out Boy

Single by Fall Out Boy

from the album Infinity on High
- Released: December 12, 2006 (US)
- Recorded: 2006
- Studio: Pass (Los Angeles)
- Genre: Emo; post-hardcore; pop-punk
- Length: 3:23
- Label: Island
- Songwriters: Pete Wentz; Patrick Stump; Joe Trohman; Andy Hurley; Wesley Eisold
- Producer: Neal Avron

Fall Out Boy singles chronology
"This Ain't a Scene, It's an Arms Race" (2006)	"The Carpal Tunnel of Love" (2006)	"Thnks fr th Mmrs" (2007)

"The Carpal Tunnel of Love" is a song by American rock band Fall Out Boy from their 2007 album Infinity on High, released as the album's second single on December 12, 2006. It is the tenth track on the album.

== Background ==
In mid-November 2006, "The Carpal Tunnel of Love" was the first taste of Infinity on High when the band made it available online via AbsolutePunk, before a pre-album release to iTunes on December 12, 2006, as a digital single. In addition, a web-exclusive video was released, but later saw televised airplay on Music Choice On-Demand. The song debuted on the US Billboard Hot 100 at number No. 81 on the strength of digital downloads and minor airplay, also coming in at No. 67 on the defunct-Pop 100.

The song was featured in the Sony video game MLB 07: The Show.

== Composition ==
"The Carpal Tunnel of Love" has been referred to as "a prime slab of what the boys have become famous for: highly caffeinated pop-punk mixed with a little white-boy soul and some hard-core yelping." The song features Stump singing in a falsetto in the chorus over Trohman's "crunchy" guitars, as well as a breakdown in which Wentz employs unclean vocals, similar to how he used to in his former band, Arma Angelus. It is one of two Fall Out Boy singles to feature Pete Wentz's screams; the other is "Saturday".

== Lyrical content ==
Elements of Wentz's lyrics were alleged to have been stolen from the works of Give Up the Ghost/Some Girls singer and lyricist Wesley Eisold, who sued the band for copyright infringement after the song was released. Eisold was credited as an "inspirador" in the album liner notes in all versions of the albums. Fall Out Boy settled out of court. The song title is a pun combining carpal tunnel syndrome and the tunnel of love amusement ride.

== Music video ==
On February 2, 2007, the music video was made available on Fall Out Boy's website and was directed by Happy Tree Friends creator Kenn Navarro. The video features Happy Tree Friends characters and cartoon versions of the band in a plot where Cuddles and Giggles have fallen in love, and Cuddles' attempts to express his love to Giggles fail to work due to Lumpy’s interferences. All of the characters, including the Fall Out Boy members (who are decapitated), get killed in graphic and ultraviolent ways in this video due to Lumpy's antics. Cuddles and Giggles end up being impaled by a pipe, eventually kissing posthumously.

== Personnel ==
Personnel taken from Infinity on High CD booklet.

Fall Out Boy

- Andy Hurley
- Patrick Stump
- Joe Trohman
- Pete Wentz

Production

- Neal Avron – production, recording, mixing
- Erich Talaba – additional engineering
- Zeph Sowers – recording assistant
- George Gumbs – mixing assistant
- Ted Jensen – mastering

== Charts ==
Chart (2007)	Peak position
US Billboard Hot 100	81
US Pop 100 (Billboard)	67
