= Thnks fr th Mmrs =

2007 single by Fall Out Boy

Single by Fall Out Boy

from the album Infinity on High
- B-side: "Our Lawyers Made Us Change the Name of This Song So We Wouldn't Get Sued"
- Released: March 27, 2007
- Studio: Brandon's Way Recording (Los Angeles)
- Genre: Pop-punk; pop rock; alternative rock; emo
- Length: 3:23
- Label: Island
- Songwriters: Pete Wentz; Patrick Stump; Joe Trohman; Andy Hurley
- Producer: Babyface

Fall Out Boy singles chronology
"The Carpal Tunnel of Love" (2006)	"Thnks fr th Mmrs" (2007)	"The Take Over, the Breaks Over" (2007)

Audio sample
- file; help

Music video
- "Thnks fr th Mmrs" on YouTube

"Thnks fr th Mmrs" (a disemvoweling of "Thanks for the Memories") is a song by American rock band Fall Out Boy. The song debuted on radio on March 20, 2007, and was released on March 27 as the third single from their third studio album, Infinity on High. With music composed by Patrick Stump and the lyrics penned by bassist Pete Wentz, the song was one of the two tracks produced by Babyface for the album.

"Thnks fr th Mmrs" was a commercial success, reaching No. 11 on the Billboard Hot 100 in the United States, and became the band's highest charting and most popular single in Australia at No. 3 on the ARIA charts. It was certified Gold by the Recording Industry Association of America (RIAA) for shipments of 500,000 units, and Platinum in Australia for shipments of 70,000 copies. The song went 2× Platinum in the US in December 2009, becoming another two-million seller for the band, along the lines of their earlier single "Sugar, We're Goin Down" from their previous 2005 album From Under the Cork Tree. "Thnks fr th Mmrs" became a staple at the band's concerts, interview performances and radio, being one of the band's most recognized singles.

== Overview ==
In an interview with Genius, bassist Pete Wentz explained that the song revolves around the theme of a broken relationship, but also contains critical commentary towards society's obsession with fame.

The title, "Thnks fr th Mmrs" is the words "thanks for the memories" after having been disemvowelled. The title's removal of vowels comes as a facetious nod at record label Island Records, who had asked them to shorten their often verbose song titles. The line that appears near the end of each chorus, "He tastes like you, only sweeter", is a line from the play and film Closer.

== Chart performance ==
The song peaked outside of the top 10 at No. 11 on the U.S. Billboard Hot 100, nine places lower than previous single "This Ain't a Scene, It's an Arms Race". It was later certified six-times Platinum by the Recording Industry Association of America (RIAA), denoting the shipment of 6,000,000 copies, as well as selling 2,527,000 digital copies in the US as of February 2014. The song also peaked at No. 19 the U.S. Modern Rock Tracks and No. 13 on the Mainstream Top 40.

In Australia, "Thnks fr th Mmrs" reached a peak of No. 3 on the ARIA chart, after initially peaking at No. 4, making it the band's highest-charting song in that region and the second top 10 hit single from Infinity on High there. It was certified Platinum by the Australian Recording Industry Association (ARIA) for the shipment of 70,000 units. In the UK, the track peaked at No. 12, making it another top 20 hit for the band there. Since 2007, "Thnks fr th Mmrs" has sold over 200,000 copies to date, becoming one of the band's biggest selling singles in the UK. In New Zealand, the song placed at No. 11. In Ireland the track came in at No. 17.

== Music video ==
The music video opens with Patrick Stump and Pete Wentz talking before filming it. Stump asks Wentz if he is sure about something; Wentz replies, "Patrick, the guy's a visionary." The song then starts up, and suddenly, a chimpanzee yells "Cut!" and calls the band a "joke", complaining that he should have hired Panic! at the Disco. The chimpanzee then texts somebody on his phone, complaining that the band is "wack". Later, Andy Hurley is replaced by another ape, and when he tries to retrieve his drumsticks, he is thrown out of the studio. In one scene, Pete is shown receiving a phone call from William Beckett of fellow Decaydance band The Academy Is... (it is a cross connection between the video for The Academy Is...'s "We've Got a Big Mess on Our Hands" which shows Beckett making this call to Wentz). Other scenes show the band playing the song on a brightly lit stage with the letters "FOB" in the background, and the band's different communications with the chimpanzees. At one point during filming, Wentz sits on a bed and attempts to kiss his character's love interest (played by Kim Kardashian), only to have the chimpanzee stop him and show him the correct way to kiss her. Unhappy with the chimpanzee's demands, Wentz tries to leave, before Kardashian stops him and the couple kiss, prompting Wentz to stay. In the final scene, Wentz breaks the choreography. As the chimpanzee angrily complains about his behavior and calls him a "prima donna" (a reference to Fall Out Boy's earlier single, "This Ain't a Scene, It's an Arms Race") and begins caressing Kardashian, Wentz smashes his bass guitar into the "B" from the "FOB" lights on the back wall, then leaves the stage. The "B" falls off leaving "FO". The video was directed by Alan Ferguson.

The "FOB" lights on the back wall of the video can be seen floating on the water in the music video for Fall Out Boy's "What a Catch, Donnie".

In 2018, Fall Out Boy released a music video for "Bishops Knife Trick", the tenth track off their 2018 album Mania, which heavily parodies "Thnks fr th Mmrs".

== Track listing ==
Lyrics written by bassist/backing vocalist Pete Wentz; music composed by Fall Out Boy.

Yellow vinyl

1. "Thnks fr th Mmrs"
2. "Our Lawyers Made Us Change the Name of This Song So We Wouldn't Get Sued" (live from Hammersmith)

US CD

1. "Lindbergh Palace Remix" – 7:53
2. "Thnks fr th Mmrs" (album version) – 3:23

The Remixes (CD and Masterbeat.com)

1. "Thnks fr th Mmrs" (The Lindbergh Palace Radio Edit) – 3:53
2. "Thnks fr th Mmrs" (Lenny B Short Term Memory) – 3:51
3. "Thnks fr th Mmrs" (Lenny B Radio Edit) – 5:11
4. "Thnks fr th Mmrs" (The Lindbergh Palace Remix) – 7:50
5. "Thnks fr th Mmrs" (The Lindbergh Palace Remix with DJ Intro) – 7:14
6. "Thnks fr th Mmrs" (Lenny B Long Term Memory) – 6:37
7. "Thnks fr th Mmrs" (Lenny B Club Remix) – 8:25
8. "Thnks fr th Mmrs" (The Lindbergh Palace Dub) – 6:37

== Personnel ==
Personnel taken from Infinity on High CD booklet.

Fall Out Boy

- Andy Hurley
- Patrick Stump
- Joe Trohman
- Pete Wentz

Additional musicians

- Babyface – mandolin
- Ron Lewis – string arrangements
- The Movement Orchestra – strings

Production

- Babyface – production
- Paul Boutin – recording
- Tom Lord-Alge – mixing
- Ted Jensen – mastering

== Charts ==
=== Weekly charts ===
Chart (2007–2014)	Peak position
Australia (ARIA)	3
Austria (Ö3 Austria Top 40)	74
Belgium (Ultratip Bubbling Under Flanders)	4
Belgium (Ultratip Bubbling Under Wallonia)	16
Canada Hot 100 (Billboard)	12
Canada CHR/Top 40 (Billboard)	12
Canada Hot AC (Billboard)	12
Canada Rock (Billboard)	48
CIS Airplay (TopHit)	42
Czech Republic Airplay (ČNS IFPI)	67
Finland Airplay (Radiosoittolista)	17
Germany (GfK)	67
Hungary (Dance Top 40)	19
Hungary (Editors' Choice Top 40)	27
Ireland (IRMA)	17
Netherlands (Single Top 100)	81
New Zealand (Recorded Music NZ)	11
Russia Airplay (TopHit)	42
Scottish Singles Sales (Official Charts)	12
Slovakia Airplay (ČNS IFPI)	70
Sweden (Sverigetopplistan)	53
UK Singles (Official Charts)	12
Ukraine Airplay (TopHit)	9
US Billboard Hot 100	11
US Adult Pop Airplay (Billboard)	14
US Alternative Airplay (Billboard)	19
US Dance Club Songs (Billboard)	14
US Pop 100 (Billboard)	9
US Pop Airplay (Billboard)	13
US Rock Digital Songs (Billboard)	23
Venezuela Pop Rock (Record Report)	7

=== Year-end charts ===
Chart (2007)	Position
Australia (ARIA)	16
Hungary (Dance Top 40)	82
New Zealand (RIANZ)	41
UK Singles (OCC)	102
US Billboard Hot 100	37
US Adult Top 40 (Billboard)	39
US Pop 100 (Billboard)	31

== Certifications ==
Certifications for "Thnks fr th Mmrs"
Region	Certification	Certified units/sales
Australia (ARIA)	Platinum	70,000^{^}
Brazil (Pro-Música Brasil)	Gold	30,000^{‡}
Canada (Music Canada)	Platinum	80,000^{*}
Denmark (IFPI Danmark)	Gold	45,000^{‡}
Germany (BVMI)	Gold	150,000^{‡}
New Zealand (RMNZ)	3× Platinum	90,000^{‡}
United Kingdom (BPI)	2× Platinum	1,200,000^{‡}
United States (RIAA)	8× Platinum	8,000,000^{‡}
^{*} Sales figures based on certification alone.^{^} Shipments figures based on certification alone.^{‡} Sales+streaming figures based on certification alone.
