= This Ain't a Scene, It's an Arms Race =

2007 single by Fall Out Boy

Single by Fall Out Boy

from the album Infinity on High
- B-side: "G.I.N.A.S.F.S"; "It's Hard to Say "I Do", When I Don't"
- Released: December 5, 2006
- Studio: Pass (Los Angeles)
- Genre: Pop-punk; emo; dance-rock
- Length: 3:32
- Label: Island
- Songwriters: Pete Wentz; Patrick Stump; Joe Trohman; Andy Hurley
- Producer: Neal Avron

Fall Out Boy singles chronology
"The Carpal Tunnel of Love" (2006)	"This Ain't a Scene, It's an Arms Race" (2006)	"Thnks fr th Mmrs" (2007)

Remix featuring Kanye West

"This Ain't a Scene, It's an Arms Race" is a song by American rock band Fall Out Boy and the first single from their commercially successful third studio album Infinity on High (2007). The song officially debuted on November 21 at the American Music Awards and impacted US radio on December 5. The music was composed by vocalist and guitarist Patrick Stump and the lyrics were penned by bassist Pete Wentz, following the band's songwriting approach which first began with some songs on their 2003 album Take This to Your Grave. Production was handled by Neal Avron, who also produced the band's previous From Under the Cork Tree album. Commenting on the band's decision to pick the track as a single, Wentz said "There may be other songs on the record that would be bigger radio hits, but this one had the right message."

The track was a commercial success and the band's major international breakthrough. "This Ain't a Scene, It's an Arms Race" debuted and peaked at No. 2 on the US Billboard Hot 100 with 162,000 first week sales and broke various records, along with being the band's highest-charting single to date. It is the group's first single to chart worldwide in countries including Australia, New Zealand and most of the European nations, where it reached the top five in many. After its Platinum RIAA and ARIA certifications in 2007, in 2013 it was certified Silver by the British Phonographic Industry (BPI) for 200,000 sales. In Australia, it spent nine consecutive weeks at either No. 4 or No. 5.

The song was released as a downloadable track for the video game Rock Band on May 6, 2008, and is also on Rock Band Track Pack Volume 2. The January 2009 issue of PlayStation: The Official Magazine lists Fall Out Boy's "This Ain't a Scene, It's an Arms Race" as second on its list of Rock Band's Five Most Unexpectedly Rockin' Downloadable Songs. The song is also on SingStar Amped and available as a downloadable content for Guitar Hero 5.

== Release ==
The song was first made available for streaming on November 17, 2006. The single was released as a CD single, digital download and also as a 7-inch blue vinyl and 7-inch purple vinyl. The vinyls' B-sides, "G.I.N.A.S.F.S." and "It's Hard to Say "I Do", When I Don't", were released as bonus tracks from Infinity on High in certain countries, with both included as bonus tracks on the deluxe editions of the album.

=== Censorship ===
In most public performances of the song, as well as in radio edits, and the music video on YouTube, the word "God" is removed from the song, to avoid using the profanity "Goddamn", although "damn" is simultaneously removed in some other versions. This censoring was also kept on the Rock Band downloadable track of the song, though it was not censored in the United Kingdom, on United States Rock radio, or in Guitar Hero 5.

== Composition ==
=== Music ===
"This Ain't a Scene, It's an Arms Race" has been described as a pop-punk, emo and dance-rock song. Vocalist and guitarist Patrick Stump called it the "funkiest thing we've ever done", and attributed the change in musical style to his love of soul music, which he acquired by listening to oldies stations as a child. Bassist Pete Wentz described the song "a bit of '70s funk mixed with [the band’s 2003 album] Take This to Your Grave with tight verses and big, fat choruses". The song closing sing-along was influenced by Justin Timberlake's "Señorita".

=== Lyrics ===
On "This Ain't a Scene, It's an Arms Race", Wentz uses wartime-inspired metaphors to discuss the band's newfound popularity; he called the song "kind of a tongue-in-cheek look at the way we are so addicted and obsessed with new arts, cultures and loves — to the point where it just becomes oversaturated." He commented, "I think people are gonna read into it what they will. In the back of my head it's a call to arms, but not [in the traditional sense] — more in the way that you sometimes need to just talk to yourself in the mirror." Slant Magazine called it "an unexpectedly funky battle cry that likens the quest for respect and fame to a combat situation."

The song is reportedly about Wentz's frustration with the ever-growing "emo scene". As he told Rolling Stone, "There may be other songs on the record that would be bigger radio hits, but this one had the right message." Wentz's inspiration for the "arms-dealer" metaphor came from the movie Lord of War. The song has also been interpreted to be a critique on artists making music just for the money and fame, an "arms race", instead of music for the fun of it.

== Remix ==
Fall Out Boy tried to rush the remix for the song featuring Kanye West onto Infinity on High, but it was not ready in time. A remix to this remix leaked on FriendsorEnemies.com featuring Kanye West, Paul Wall, Skinhead Rob, Lupe Fiasco, Tyga, Travis McCoy, and Lil Wayne. This remix was performed at the 2007 MTV Video Music Awards, along with Brendon Urie (of Panic! at the Disco).

== Music video ==
The video was directed by Alan Ferguson. The sequel to the "Dance, Dance" video, it shows the band members leaving the video shoot among the supposed "fans", all but a few of which turn out to be cardboard cutouts. The video portrays the band in a series of "celebrity" situations such as dealing with paparazzi, as well as recording their song in a very out-of-character hip-hop studio (a reference to a song they recorded on Timbaland's album). Patrick starts singing and making strange movements with his hands, much like Joe Cocker. Guitarist Joe Trohman knocks a bottle of liquor out of a rapper's hand, and a tabloid headline reveals that the rappers proceeded to assault the band and throw them out of the studio. The next scene shows the band playing in a hotel room, making a huge mess partying.

It transfers to Pete, at a photo shoot. The photographer (Ellis Martin-actor/photographer) takes a cell phone from his coworker and takes pictures with it, and prompts Pete to show his penis, making it look like Pete took them (in reference to real cell phone photos leaked from Pete's cell phone after he took them to send to his girlfriend). Several teenage girls are outraged after they see the pictures and realize Pete has a small penis.

Following the incident, drummer Andy Hurley goes to a party at a parody of the Playboy Mansion with a crotch-stuffing. The scene goes back to the hotel room. While partying, a heavy set man jumps onto the other side of the bed that Pete is on, causing him to fall through a closed window to his death.

At his funeral, cameo appearances are made by several characters from their previous music videos, such as Pete's date in "Dance, Dance", the teenage girl from "Grand Theft Autumn/Where Is Your Boy"'s music video, their stunt man and close friend Dirty, the deer-boy from "Sugar, We're Goin Down" (Donald Cumming of the Virgins), William Beckett of The Academy Is... as the vampire from "A Little Less Sixteen Candles..." and Travie McCoy of Gym Class Heroes (who also danced in "Dance, Dance") and celebrities Seth Green and Michelle Trachtenberg, among others. Joe is performing a guitar solo on top of Pete's coffin as it rises out of the burial, before Pete bursts out. Joe claims this is a reference to guitarist Slash in the Guns N' Roses video for "November Rain" although some fans have likened it to Synyster Gates's solo in Avenged Sevenfold's video for "Seize the Day".

The ending of the video reveals that the entire video is nothing more than a dream of Pete's, flashing back to the band's early days. Andy (who was sitting next to Pete) then realizes that they are late for a performance at a bingo hall and as they make their way onstage, they continue playing the rest of the song from the last chorus. The end of the video shows Pete attempting to stage dive.

=== Sequel ===
The music video for "Hold Me Like a Grudge", the third single off the band's eighth studio album, So Much (for) Stardust, acts as a sequel to the video for "This Ain't a Scene, It’s an Arms Race". The beginning of Hold Me Like A Grudge shows what happened after Pete attempted to stage dive, it is revealed that Pete broke his leg, and ends up getting a bionic leg and becoming a superhero for 20 years.

== Commercial performance ==
The single was a commercial success worldwide. In the United States, the song debuted and peaked at No. 2 on the Billboard Hot 100 being the first song in five years to debut in the top ten without the artist being an American Idol Finalist. It also stayed at number two for two weeks, spending its first nine weeks in the top 10 out of a total of 20 chart weeks. In its Hot 100 opening week with digital availability, the song soared to No. 1 on the Pop 100 chart up from its previous week's position of No. 86. In its opening week, it sold 162,000 digital downloads, setting a new record for the highest bow for a band since radio only titles joined the chart in 1998. Fall Out Boy's multi-format sales for their "Infinity" On High" album opened at approximately 260,000 in the album's first three weeks. Many of these sales were in response to the leading single "This Ain't a Scene, It's an Arms Race." In addition, its download totals are the largest opening-week tally for a group since Nielsen SoundScan began tracking digital sales in 2003. It also set a record as the highest debut of 2007 and was, at the time, the eighth song to debut at the runner-up position in the history of the Hot 100. Prior to its digital release, "This Ain't a Scene, It's an Arms Race" spent several weeks doing well on Pop radio airplay. In its first week of digital availability, the single catapulted to the top of the digital downloads chart as well as the overall pop singles chart. It marked Fall Out Boy's first number one hit song and was certified three-times Platinum by the Recording Industry Association of America (RIAA) for shipments of three million units.

It is Fall Out Boy's highest-charting song to date (albeit not their best-selling), and on the strength of 162,000 opening week downloads earned the band their first No. 1 Billboard Hot Digital Song and also a No. 1 on the now-defunct Pop 100 chart. It stayed atop the Digital Songs chart for four consecutive weeks, gathering over 500,000 downloads in that period. Internationally, it reached the top position in New Zealand and No. 2 in the UK, making it their largest hit in those countries. In New Zealand it peaked at No. 1, while in Australia it reached No. 4 and was certified Platinum by the Australian Recording Industry Association (ARIA). The song was ranked No. 40 on Rolling Stone's list of the 100 Best Songs of 2007. Fall Out Boy reached international fame and success in 2007, with "This Ain't a Scene, It's an Arms Race" also charting all over Europe, reaching No. 9 on Billboard's European Hot 100 chart. On July 22, 2013, it was eventually certified Silver by the British Phonographic Industry (BPI) for 200,000 sales.

== Track listings ==
Lyrics were written by bassist Pete Wentz; music was composed by Fall Out Boy.

CD single

1. "This Ain't a Scene, It's an Arms Race"
2. "The Carpal Tunnel of Love"

7-inch blue vinyl

1. "This Ain't a Scene, It's an Arms Race"
2. "It's Hard to Say "I Do", When I Don't"

7-inch purple vinyl

1. "This Ain't a Scene, It's an Arms Race"
2. "G.I.N.A.S.F.S."

== Personnel ==
Personnel taken from Infinity on High CD booklet.

Fall Out Boy

- Andy Hurley
- Patrick Stump
- Joe Trohman
- Pete Wentz

Guest musicians

- Butch Walker – crowd vocals
- Sofia Toufa – crowd vocals
- Lindsey Blaufarb – crowd vocals

Production

- Neal Avron – production, recording, mixing
- Erich Talaba – additional engineering
- Zeph Sowers – recording assistant
- George Gumbs – mixing assistant
- Ted Jensen – mastering

== Charts ==
=== Weekly charts ===
Weekly chart performance for "This Ain't a Scene, It's an Arms Race"
Chart (2007)	Peak position
Australia (ARIA)	4
Austria (Ö3 Austria Top 40)	48
Belgium (Ultratip Bubbling Under Flanders)	22
Canada Digital Song Sales (Billboard)	1
Canada Hot 100 (Billboard)	4 (Note: "This Ain't a Scene, It's an Arms Race" had already peaked in popularity when the first issue of the Canadian Hot 100 was released on March 31, 2007.)
CIS Airplay (TopHit) Kanye West remix	49
Czech Republic Airplay (ČNS IFPI)	43
Europe (European Hot 100 Singles)	9
France (SNEP)	11
Germany (GfK)	54
Ireland (IRMA)	5
Netherlands (Single Top 100)	41
New Zealand (Recorded Music NZ)	1
Russia Airplay (TopHit) Kanye West remix	44
Scottish Singles Sales (Official Charts)	2
Sweden (Sverigetopplistan)	34
Switzerland (Schweizer Hitparade)	59
UK Singles (Official Charts)	2
Ukraine Airplay (TopHit)	180
US Billboard Hot 100	2
US Adult Pop Airplay (Billboard)	18
US Alternative Airplay (Billboard)	8
US Pop 100 (Billboard)	1
US Pop Airplay (Billboard)	14

=== Year-end charts ===
Year-end chart performance for "This Ain't a Scene, It's an Arms Race"
Chart (2007)	Position
Australia (ARIA)	14
Brazil (Crowley)	64
CIS Airplay (TopHit)	167
Europe (European Hot 100 Singles)	60
France (SNEP)	63
New Zealand (RIANZ)	28
Russia Airplay (TopHit)	153
UK Singles (OCC)	35
US Billboard Hot 100	32
US Alternative Songs (Billboard)	26

== Certifications ==
Certifications for "This Ain't a Scene, It's an Arms Race"
Region	Certification	Certified units/sales
Australia (ARIA)	Platinum	70,000^{^}
Brazil (Pro-Música Brasil)	Gold	30,000^{‡}
New Zealand (RMNZ)	Platinum	30,000^{‡}
United Kingdom (BPI)	Platinum	600,000^{‡}
United States (RIAA)	4× Platinum	4,000,000^{‡}
^{^} Shipments figures based on certification alone.^{‡} Sales+streaming figures based on certification alone.

== Release history ==
Release dates and formats for "This Ain't a Scene, It's an Arms Race"
Region	Date	Format(s)	Label	Ref.
United States	December 4–5, 2006	Alternative radio; contemporary hit radio; hot adult contemporary radio	Island	
United States	January 16, 2007	Digital download	Island	
Australia	January 22, 2007	CD single	Universal	
United Kingdom	January 29, 2007	CD single	Mercury	
United States	March 13, 2007	Digital download (Kanye West remix)	Island	
