= So Much For (Tour) Dust =

2023–24 concert tour by Fall Out Boy

- Tour by Fall Out Boy
- Location: Asia; Europe; North America; Oceania
- Associated album: So Much (for) Stardust
- Start date: June 21, 2023
- End date: May 11, 2024
- Legs: 5
- No. of shows: 79
- Supporting acts: Alkaline Trio; The Academy Is...; Royal & The Serpent; Daisy Grenade; Bring Me the Horizon; New Found Glory; Carr; Games We Play; Four Year Strong; Pvris; Nothing,Nowhere; Jimmy Eat World; The Maine; Hot Mulligan
Fall Out Boy tour chronology
Hella Mega Tour (2021–22)	So Much For (Tour) Dust (2023–24)	Twilight of the Punks (2027)

So Much For (Tour) Dust was a concert tour by American rock band Fall Out Boy, in support of their eighth studio album So Much (for) Stardust, which was released on March 24, 2023. It was their first solo headlining tour since the Mania Tour in 2017–2018.

== Background ==
On January 18, 2023, the band released "Love from the Other Side", the lead single for their album So Much (for) Stardust, followed up by "Heartbreak Feels So Good" a week later. The band began the tour with a North American leg, which began in June and concluded in August, and featured Bring Me the Horizon as the support act on most dates. Joe Trohman was absent for many of the pre-tour performances, to focus on his mental health. He returned to performing by late April.

On February 8, the band announced the European leg, which ran from October to November. The band headlined the Good Things festival in Australia in December. Additional performances in Bangkok, Manila and Singapore also took place in December. On September 7, the band announced a second North American leg which was alternatively titled "So Much for (2our) Dust", going from February 28 to April 6, 2024, with Jimmy Eat World on support for all dates.

== Set list ==
The following set list was performed during the first show of the tour in Chicago, and is not intended to be representative of all of the shows on the tour. Each show included banter with an interactive Magic 8 Ball before the debut of a surprise song that had never been played live before. Some surprise songs were repeated at later shows, and some shows included multiple surprise songs.

1. "Love from the Other Side"
2. "The Phoenix"
3. "Sugar, We're Goin Down"
4. "Uma Thurman"
5. "A Little Less Sixteen Candles, a Little More "Touch Me""
6. "Chicago Is So Two Years Ago"
7. "Grand Theft Autumn/Where Is Your Boy"
8. "Calm Before the Storm"
9. "This Ain't a Scene, It's an Arms Race"
10. "Disloyal Order of Water Buffaloes"
11. "Heaven, Iowa"
12. ""The Take Over, the Breaks Over""
13. "Headfirst Slide into Cooperstown on a Bad Bet"
14. "Fake Out"
15. "Lake Shore Drive" / "Don't Stop Believin'" (Aliotta Haynes Jeremiah and Journey cover medley)
16. "The Last of the Real Ones"
17. "Save Rock and Roll"
18. "Baby Annihilation"
19. "Crazy Train" (Ozzy Osbourne cover)
20. "Dance, Dance"
21. "Hold Me Like a Grudge"
22. "G.I.N.A.S.F.S."
23. "My Songs Know What You Did in the Dark (Light Em Up)"
24. "Thnks fr th Mmrs"
25. "Centuries"
26. "Saturday"

=== Magic 8 Ball Songs ===
Fall Out Boy performed a different surprise song every night called the Magic 8 Ball song, often including older songs that have never been performed live before. Later shows eventually included repeats or songs that were performed on prior tours.

==== 2023 ====
- June 21 – Chicago: "G.I.N.A.S.F.S."
- June 23 – Maryland Heights: "Of All the Gin Joints in All the World"
- June 24 – Bonner Springs: "Sophomore Slump or Comeback of the Year"
- June 27 – The Woodlands: "The Kintsugi Kid (Ten Years)"
- June 28 – Dallas: "The (After) Life of the Party"
- June 30 – Phoenix: "Homesick at Space Camp"
- July 1 – Chula Vista: "(Coffee's for Closers)"
- July 2 – Los Angeles: "G.I.N.A.S.F.S." and "America's Suitehearts"
- July 3 – Los Angeles: "The (After) Life of the Party" and "Bang the Doldrums"
- July 5 – Mountain View: "The Patron Saint of Liars and Fakes"
- July 7 – West Valley City: "The Kids Aren't Alright"
- July 9 – Greenwood Village: "Nobody Puts Baby in the Corner"
- July 11 – Rogers: "I Slept With Someone in Fall Out Boy and All I Got Was This Stupid Song Written About Me"
- July 13 – Somerset: "Fame < Infamy"
- July 15 – Cincinnati: "Favorite Record"
- July 16 – Noblesville: "Where Did the Party Go"
- July 18 – Cuyahoga Falls: "27"
- July 19 – Bristow: "She's My Winona"
- July 21 – Charlotte: "Dead on Arrival"
- July 22 – Virginia Beach: "7 Minutes in Heaven (Atavan Halen)"
- July 24 – West Palm Beach: ""Tell That Mick He Just Made My List of Things to Do Today""
- July 25 – Tampa: "Miss Missing You"
- July 26 – Atlanta: ""From Now On, We Are Enemies""
- July 29 – Clarkston: "Don't You Know Who I Think I Am?"
- July 30 – Toronto: "West Coast Smoker" and "G.I.N.A.S.F.S."
- August 1 – New York City: "27" and "I Am My Own Muse"
- August 2 – Boston: "XO" and "G.I.N.A.S.F.S."
- August 4 – Darien: "You're Crashing, but You're No Wave" and "27"
- August 5 – Holmdel: "Bob Dylan" and "I Am My Own Muse"
- August 6 – Camden: "Pavlove", "27", and "G.I.N.A.S.F.S."
- October 17 – Warsaw: "Bang the Doldrums"
- October 18 – Prague: "G.I.N.A.S.F.S."
- October 20 – Milan: "I Am My Own Muse"
- October 21 – Munich: "The Kintsugi Kid (Ten Years)"
- October 23 – Paris: "The Kids Aren't Alright"
- October 24 – Amsterdam: "27"
- October 25 – Brussels: "Sophomore Slump or Comeback of the Year"
- October 27 – Leeds: "Don't You Know Who I Think I Am?"
- October 28 – Glasgow: "Young Volcanoes"
- October 29 – Manchester: "The (After) Life of the Party"
- October 31 – Birmingham: "You're Crashing, but You're No Wave"
- November 2 – London: "The (Shipped) Gold Standard" and "Young Volcanoes"
- November 3 – London: "What a Time to Be Alive" and "American Beauty/American Psycho"
- November 4 – Cardiff: "Our Lawyer Made Us Change the Name of This Song So We Wouldn't Get Sued"
- November 6 – Oberhausen: "Thriller"
- November 7 – Hamburg: "Fame < Infamy"
- November 8 – Berlin: "XO" and "G.I.N.A.S.F.S."
- December 1 – Melbourne: "The (After) Life of the Party"
- December 3 – Brisbane: "Young Volcanoes"
- December 6 – Pak Kret: "The Kids Aren't Alright"
- December 9 – Quezon City: "Sophomore Slump or Comeback of the Year"
- December 12 – Singapore: "XO"

==== 2024 ====
- February 28 – Portland: "G.I.N.A.S.F.S."
- March 1 – Seattle: "Sophomore Slump or Comeback of the Year"
- March 3 – Sacramento: "27"
- March 4 – Anaheim: "7 Minutes in Heaven (Atavan Halen)" and "Good Girls Go Bad" (Note: The latter is a cover of and was performed with Cobra Starship)
- March 7 – Fort Worth: "The Kids Aren't Alright"
- March 8 – Austin: "Don't You Know Who I Think I Am?"
- March 11 – Oklahoma City: "Tiffany Blews"
- March 13 – Birmingham: "Young Volcanoes"
- March 15 – Orlando: "Alpha Dog"
- March 16 – Jacksonville: "I'm Like A Lawyer With The Way I'm Always Trying To Get You Off (Me & You)"
- March 19 – Raleigh: "Just One Yesterday"
- March 20 – Baltimore: "Miss Missing You"
- March 22 – New York City: "Get Busy Living or Get Busy Dying (Do Your Part to Save the Scene and Stop Going to Shows)" and "Slow Down" (Note: The latter is a cover of The Academy Is... and was performed with William Beckett.)
- March 24 – Albany: "I Am My Own Muse"
- March 26 – Grand Rapids: "Wilson (Expensive Mistakes)"
- March 27 – Pittsburgh: "The Music or the Misery"
- March 29 – Columbus: "Fourth of July"
- March 30 – Lexington: "The Kintsugi Kid (Ten Years)"
- March 31 – Nashville: "Jet Pack Blues"
- April 2 – Milwaukee: "Get Busy Living or Get Busy Dying (Do Your Part to Save the Scene and Stop Going to Shows)" and "Pavlove"
- April 3 – Des Moines: "What a Time to Be Alive"
- April 5 – Omaha: ""From Now on We Are Enemies""
- April 6 – Minneapolis: "Honorable Mention", "Get Busy Living or Get Busy Dying (Do Your Part to Save the Scene and Stop Going to Shows)", "The Carpal Tunnel of Love", "Rat a Tat" (Note: Performed with Carr), "The Kids Aren't Alright" and "Wilson (Expensive Mistakes)"

== Tour dates ==
List of 2023 concerts
Date	City	Country	Venue	Opening act	Attendance	Revenue
June 21, 2023	Chicago	United States	Wrigley Field	Alkaline Trio; The Academy Is... Royal & The Serpent	—	—
June 23, 2023	Maryland Heights	United States	Hollywood Casino Amphitheater	Alkaline Trio; Royal & The Serpent; Daisy Grenade	—	—
June 24, 2023	Bonner Springs	United States	Azura Amphitheater	Alkaline Trio; Royal & The Serpent; Daisy Grenade	—	—
June 27, 2023	The Woodlands	United States	Cynthia Woods Mitchell Pavilion	Bring Me the Horizon; Royal & The Serpent; Daisy Grenade	—	—
June 28, 2023	Dallas	United States	Dos Equis Pavilion	Bring Me the Horizon; Royal & The Serpent; Daisy Grenade	—	—
June 30, 2023	Phoenix	United States	Talking Stick Resort Amphitheatre	Royal & The Serpent; Daisy Grenade	—	—
July 1, 2023	Chula Vista	United States	North Island Credit Union Amphitheatre	Bring Me the Horizon; Royal & The Serpent; Daisy Grenade	—	—
July 2, 2023	Los Angeles	United States	BMO Stadium	Bring Me the Horizon; Royal & The Serpent; New Found Glory	—	—
July 3, 2023	Los Angeles	United States	BMO Stadium	Bring Me the Horizon; Royal & The Serpent; Daisy Grenade	—	—
July 5, 2023	Mountain View	United States	Shoreline Amphitheatre	Bring Me the Horizon; Royal & The Serpent; Daisy Grenade	—	—
July 7, 2023	West Valley City	United States	USANA Amphitheater	Bring Me the Horizon; Royal & The Serpent; Daisy Grenade	—	—
July 9, 2023	Greenwood Village	United States	Fiddlers Green Amphitheater	Bring Me the Horizon; Royal & The Serpent	—	—
July 11, 2023	Rogers	United States	Walmart AMP	Bring Me the Horizon; Royal & The Serpent; Carr	—	—
July 13, 2023	Somerset	United States	Somerset Amphitheater	Bring Me the Horizon; Royal & The Serpent; Carr	—	—
July 15, 2023	Cincinnati	United States	Riverbend Music Center	Bring Me the Horizon; Royal & The Serpent; Carr	—	—
July 16, 2023	Noblesville	United States	Ruoff Music Center	Bring Me the Horizon; Carr	—	—
July 18, 2023	Cuyahoga Falls	United States	Blossom Music Center	Bring Me the Horizon; Royal & The Serpent; Carr	—	—
July 19, 2023	Bristow	United States	Jiffy Lube Live	Bring Me the Horizon; Royal & The Serpent; Carr	—	—
July 21, 2023	Charlotte	United States	PNC Music Pavilion	Bring Me the Horizon; Royal & The Serpent; Carr	—	—
July 22, 2023	Virginia Beach	United States	Veterans United Home Loans Amphitheater	Bring Me the Horizon; Royal & The Serpent; Carr	—	—
July 24, 2023	West Palm Beach	United States	iTHINK Financial Amphitheatre	Bring Me the Horizon; Royal & The Serpent; Carr	—	—
July 25, 2023	Tampa	United States	MidFlorida Credit Union Amphitheatre	Bring Me the Horizon; Royal & The Serpent; Carr	—	—
July 26, 2023	Atlanta	United States	Lakewood Amphitheatre	Bring Me the Horizon; Royal & The Serpent; Carr	—	—
July 29, 2023	Clarkston	United States	Pine Knob Music Theater	Bring Me the Horizon; Royal & The Serpent; Games We Play	—	—
July 30, 2023	Toronto	Canada	Budweiser Stage	Bring Me the Horizon; Royal & The Serpent; Games We Play	—	—
August 1, 2023	New York City	United States	Forest Hills Stadium	Bring Me the Horizon; Royal & The Serpent; Games We Play	—	—
August 2, 2023	Boston	United States	Fenway Park	Bring Me the Horizon; Four Year Strong; Royal & The Serpent	—	—
August 4, 2023	Darien	United States	Darien Lake Performing Arts Center	Bring Me the Horizon; Royal & The Serpent; Games We Play	—	—
August 5, 2023	Holmdel	United States	PNC Bank Arts Center	Bring Me the Horizon; Royal & The Serpent; Games We Play	—	—
August 6, 2023	Camden	United States	Freedom Mortgage Pavilion	Bring Me the Horizon; Royal & The Serpent; Games We Play	—	—
October 17, 2023	Warsaw	Poland	Arena COS Torwar	Pvris; Nothing,Nowhere	—	—
October 18, 2023	Prague	Czech Republic	Sportovní hala Fortuna	Pvris; Nothing,Nowhere	—	—
October 20, 2023	Milan	Italy	Mediolanum Forum	Pvris; Nothing,Nowhere	—	—
October 21, 2023	Munich	Germany	Zenith	Pvris; Nothing,Nowhere	—	—
October 23, 2023	Paris	France	Zenith	Pvris; Nothing,Nowhere	—	—
October 24, 2023	Amsterdam	Netherlands	AFAS Live	Pvris; Nothing,Nowhere	—	—
October 25, 2023	Brussels	Belgium	Forest National	Pvris; Nothing,Nowhere	—	—
October 27, 2023	Leeds	England	First Direct Arena	Pvris; Nothing,Nowhere	—	—
October 28, 2023	Glasgow	Scotland	OVO Hydro	Pvris; Nothing,Nowhere	—	—
October 29, 2023	Manchester	England	AO Arena	Pvris; Nothing,Nowhere	—	—
October 31, 2023	Birmingham	England	Utilita Arena	Pvris; Nothing,Nowhere	—	—
November 2, 2023	London	England	The O2 Arena	Pvris; Nothing,Nowhere	—	—
November 3, 2023	London	England	The O2 Arena	Pvris; Nothing,Nowhere	—	—
November 4, 2023	Cardiff	Wales	Cardiff International Arena	Pvris; Nothing,Nowhere	—	—
November 6, 2023	Oberhausen	Germany	Rudolf Weber-Arena	Pvris; Nothing,Nowhere	—	—
November 7, 2023	Hamburg	Germany	Barclays Arena	Pvris; Nothing,Nowhere	—	—
November 8, 2023	Berlin	Germany	Max-Schmeling-Halle	Pvris; Nothing,Nowhere	—	—
December 1, 2023 (Note: The December 1, 2 and 3, 2023 performances are set to be a part of Good Things Festival.)	Melbourne	Australia	Flemington Racecourse	—N/a	—	—
December 2, 2023 (Note: The performance on December 2, 2023, which was part of the Good Things Festival was abruptly cut short due to inclement weather.)	Sydney	Australia	Centennial Park	—N/a	—	—
December 3, 2023	Brisbane	Australia	Brisbane Showgrounds	—N/a	—	—
December 6, 2023	Pak Kret	Thailand	Thunderdome Stadium	—N/a	—	—
December 9, 2023	Quezon City	Philippines	Araneta Coliseum	—N/a	—	—
December 12, 2023	Singapore		Suntec Convention Centre	—N/a	—	—

List of 2024 concerts
Date	City	Country	Venue	Opening act	Attendance	Revenue
February 28, 2024	Portland	United States	Moda Center	Jimmy Eat World; The Maine; Daisy Grenade	—	—
March 1, 2024	Seattle	United States	Climate Pledge Arena	Jimmy Eat World; The Maine; Daisy Grenade	—	—
March 3, 2024	Sacramento	United States	Golden 1 Center	Jimmy Eat World; The Maine; Daisy Grenade	—	—
March 4, 2024	Anaheim	United States	Honda Center	Jimmy Eat World; The Maine; Daisy Grenade	—	—
March 7, 2024	Fort Worth	United States	Dickies Arena	Jimmy Eat World; The Maine; Daisy Grenade	—	—
March 8, 2024	Austin	United States	Moody Center	Jimmy Eat World; The Maine; Daisy Grenade	—	—
March 11, 2024	Oklahoma City	United States	Paycom Center	Jimmy Eat World; The Maine; Daisy Grenade	—	—
March 13, 2024	Birmingham	United States	Legacy Arena	Jimmy Eat World; The Maine; Daisy Grenade	—	—
March 15, 2024	Orlando	United States	Kia Center	Jimmy Eat World; The Maine; Games We Play	—	—
March 16, 2024	Jacksonville	United States	VyStar Veterans Memorial Arena	Jimmy Eat World; The Maine; Games We Play	—	—
March 19, 2024	Raleigh	United States	PNC Arena	Jimmy Eat World; Hot Mulligan; Games We Play	—	—
March 20, 2024	Baltimore	United States	CFG Bank Arena	Jimmy Eat World; Hot Mulligan; Games We Play	—	—
March 22, 2024	New York	United States	Madison Square Garden	Jimmy Eat World; Hot Mulligan; Games We Play	—	—
March 24, 2024	Albany	United States	MVP Arena	Jimmy Eat World; Hot Mulligan; Games We Play	—	—
March 26, 2024	Grand Rapids	United States	Van Andel Arena	Jimmy Eat World; Hot Mulligan; Games We Play	—	—
March 27, 2024	Pittsburgh	United States	PPG Paints Arena	Jimmy Eat World; Hot Mulligan; CARR	—	—
March 29, 2024	Columbus	United States	Schottenstein Center	Jimmy Eat World; Hot Mulligan; CARR	—	—
March 30, 2024	Lexington	United States	Rupp Arena	Jimmy Eat World; Hot Mulligan; CARR	—	—
March 31, 2024	Nashville	United States	Bridgestone Arena	Jimmy Eat World; Hot Mulligan; CARR	—	—
April 2, 2024	Milwaukee	United States	Fiserv Forum	Jimmy Eat World; Hot Mulligan; CARR	—	—
April 3, 2024	Des Moines	United States	Wells Fargo Arena	Jimmy Eat World; Hot Mulligan; CARR	—	—
April 5, 2024	Omaha	United States	CHI Health Center	Jimmy Eat World; Hot Mulligan; CARR	—	—
April 6, 2024	Minneapolis	United States	Target Center	Jimmy Eat World; Hot Mulligan; CARR	—	—
May 2, 2024	Chengdu	China	Weiran Flower Sea Park	—N/a	—	—
May 4, 2024	Shanghai	China	SPD Bank Oriental Sports Center	—N/a	—	—
May 8, 2024	Beijing	China	National Indoor Stadium	—N/a	—	—
May 11, 2024	Guangzhou	China	Baoneng Guangzhou Arena	—N/a	—	—

== Personnel ==
- Andy Hurley – drums, percussion and backing vocals
- Patrick Stump – lead vocals, rhythm guitar and piano
- Joe Trohman – lead guitar and backing vocals
- Pete Wentz – bass guitar and backing vocals

=== Additional personnel ===
- Tosh Peterson – drums (Note: Peterson filled in for Hurley during Charlotte and Virginia Beach shows due to family emergency.)
- Ben Young – lead guitar (Note: Young filled in for Trohman during warmup shows, and appeared for a song during Virginia Beach show.)
