= So Much (for) Stardust =

2023 studio album by Fall Out Boy

Studio album by Fall Out Boy
- Released: March 24, 2023
- Studios: The Casita (Hollywood); Sunset Sound (Hollywood); London Bridge (Seattle); Angel (London); Igloo (Burbank); East West (Hollywood)
- Genres: Pop rock; alternative rock; pop-punk; power pop; symphonic rock
- Length: 44:14
- Labels: Fueled by Ramen; Elektra; DCD2
- Producer: Neal Avron

Fall Out Boy chronology
| Greatest Hits: Believers Never Die – Volume Two (2019) | So Much (for) Stardust (2023) |

Singles from So Much (for) Stardust
- 1. "Love from the Other Side" Released: January 18, 2023; 2. "Heartbreak Feels So Good" Released: January 25, 2023; 3. "Hold Me Like a Grudge" Released: March 24, 2023; 4. "So Much (for) Stardust" Released: February 28, 2024

So Much (for) Stardust is the eighth studio album by American rock band Fall Out Boy. It was released on March 24, 2023, on Fueled by Ramen, Elektra Records and DCD2. It is their first album in five years, following the release of Mania (2018).

The album reunites the band with producer Neal Avron, who last produced Folie à Deux (2008), and also marks the band's return to their original record label Fueled by Ramen, who released their debut album Take This to Your Grave (2003). The album saw a return to a more guitar-oriented pop rock and pop-punk sound, comparable to their 2008 album Folie à Deux, with disco, soul, funk, spoken word, and orchestral elements.

The lead single from the album, "Love from the Other Side", was released on January 18, 2023, alongside the official announcement of the album. The second single, "Heartbreak Feels So Good", was released on January 25, 2023. The album received positive reviews from critics.

== Background ==
After receiving mixed reviews for their 2018 album, Mania, the band went silent on new music, besides releasing a second greatest hits album in 2019.

Vocalist Patrick Stump discussed the album's creation:

"Technology has made it really easy to make records much more quickly these days. There's nothing wrong with that, and that spontaneity can be exciting... But we wanted to get back to the way we used to work. We wanted to make a record that was really lovingly crafted and deliberate and patiently guided – like someone cooked you a delicate meal. I'm not a very proud guy, but I'm pretty proud of this record."

Due to the band's album deal with Island Records ending, the band signed with Fueled by Ramen and Elektra Records for the album's release, marking their first release under Fueled by Ramen since Take This to Your Grave. It was also announced that the album was produced by Neal Avron, making it the first time Fall Out Boy had worked with him since Folie à Deux.

On the same day of the single release and album announcement, guitarist Joe Trohman announced on social media that he would be taking a break from the band to focus on his mental health.

On March 3, 2023, the album's tracklist was confirmed.

== Composition ==
According to Sarah Jamieson of DIY, "[the album] sounds closer to a continuation of their 2008 record Folie à Deux than 2018's hyper-slick Mania, there's a return to the bold, luscious pop-rock that they honed early on." Writing for Clash, Shannon Garner felt that with this album, "[the band pulled] themselves back into the pop-punk realm." The album also has disco, soul and funk influences. Mark Beaumont of The Independent stated that "[the album contains] grandiose orchestral passages, spoken word interludes and touches of Bruno Mars funk pop dotted among the roaring angst rock...[that blends] of their various eras...[and] pulls the plug on the rise of the machines." Mathew Abraham of Caliber Tv considered the album to be a "return to a [rock and alternative rock kind of sound] for them, while it also mixes in poppier elements in...some of these songs." Writing for The Line of Best Fit, Jasleen Dhindsa stated, "So Much (For) Stardust...inflicts dynamic, theatrical and intense production values onto power pop and symphonic rock."

The album marks a return to a more guitar-driven sound. However, Stump maintains that "it's not a throwback record" but rather an imagining of "what would it have sounded like if we had made a record right after Folie à Deux instead of taking a break for a few years. It was like exploring the multiverse. It was an experiment in seeing what we would have done." Songs like "I Am My Own Muse" and "Love From The Other Side" "feature massive orchestral parts." "Heaven, Iowa" has been described as an arena rock track that starts slow, "but blows the audience away once the massive drums and riveting guitar hit near the halfway point." "What a Time To Be Alive" demonstrates disco and funk influences.

== Promotion ==
=== Singles ===
In December 2022, the band released a claymation animation homage, and began teasing a new song. The band made a website called sendingmylovefromtheotherside.com. On January 10, 2023, Oliver Sykes of Bring Me the Horizon posted to his Instagram story that he had received a package in the mail from Fall Out Boy containing a pink seashell labeled 1 of 13 alongside a letter with the date January 18, 2023, and the song title "Love From The Other Side". The lead single, "Love from the Other Side", was announced on January 11, 2023. The song was released on January 18, alongside the band confirming the album title and setting the release date for March 24, 2023. Since then, the band has posted a photo of another package with a set of coordinates leading to the Field of Dreams Movie Site in Dyersville, Iowa. The package contained another seashell marked 2 of 13 with a letter, this time printed was the date January 25, 2023, and a speculated song title "Heartbreak Feels So Good". On January 23, 2023, the band announced the next single, "Heartbreak Feels So Good", released on January 25, 2023, with promotion featuring actress Nicole Kidman's advertisements for AMC Theatres. A third package was left outside Wrigley Field in Chicago, Illinois.

On March 13, the band announced that "Hold Me Like a Grudge" would be the next single of the album. On March 15, a clip of the song was shared. On March 24, the same day the album was released, the band released a music video for "Hold Me Like a Grudge". The video is a continuation of the music video for the band's song, "This Ain't a Scene, It's an Arms Race".

On February 28, 2024, the band released a music video for the album's fourth single, title track “So Much (For) Stardust”, featuring NBA player Jimmy Butler.

=== Album ===
In May 2023, the band released CRYNYL, a limited edition tear-filled vinyl of the album in partnership with the art studio BRAIN.

=== TV performances ===
The band performed "Love from the Other Side" on Jimmy Kimmel Live! the same day it was released. The band performed "Heartbreak Feels So Good" on Jimmy Kimmel Live! on January 31, 2023.

=== Tour ===
On January 31, 2023, the band announced their first solo headlining tour since 2019, So Much For (Tour) Dust, with 30 dates across North America. The band was joined by Bring Me the Horizon and Royal & the Serpent with Alkaline Trio, New Found Glory, Four Year Strong, The Academy Is..., Games We Play, Daisy Grenade, and Carr appearing for select dates. Joe Trohman toured with the band following an end to his hiatus.

On February 8, 2023, the band announced a Europe and UK leg of So Much for (Tour) Dust with fifteen dates. Due to overwhelming demand, a second London date was added shortly after. The band was joined by Pvris, and nothing,nowhere. for this leg.

On September 7, 2023, the band announced a second US leg, now being stylized as So Much for (2our) Dust, which happened in 2024 with twenty-three dates. The band was joined by Jimmy Eat World along with The Maine, Hot Mulligan, Daisy Grenade, Games We Play, and Carr appearing on select dates for this leg.

The tour began on June 21, 2023, at Chicago's Wrigley Field and concluded on April 6, 2024, at Target Center in Minneapolis.

== Critical reception ==
Professional ratings
Aggregate scores
| Source | Rating |
|---|---|
| AnyDecentMusic? | 8.0/10 |
| Metacritic | 79/100 |
Review scores
| Source | Rating |
| AllMusic | 4/5 stars |
| Clash | 8/10 |
| DIY | 4.5/5 stars |
| Dork | 4/5 stars |
| Exclaim! | 7/10 |
| Kerrang! | 4/5 |
| The Line of Best Fit | 8/10 |
| NME | 4/5 stars |
| Sputnikmusic | 4.2/5 |
| The Telegraph | 3/5 stars |

So Much (for) Stardust received positive reviews upon release. The album holds a score of 79 out of 100 on review aggregator Metacritic, based on eleven critics' reviews, indicating "generally favorable reviews". Matt Collar of AllMusic called the album "a gloriously welcome return to form". Shannon Garner writing for Clash, felt that "[the band] achieved a sound that is rigorously maintained despite the wide array of influences track-to-track." Sarah Jamieson of DIY stated that the album "exudes charm and euphoria". Dillon Eastoe of Dork stated, "By the time the bombastic and addictive title-track closes things out, Fall Out Boy have achieved something remarkable; that after years of fans comparing their past to their future, the two eras of the band feel reconciled."

Ian Gormely of Exclaim! called the album "Fall Out Boy's best album in 15 years." According to Nick Ruskell of Kerrang!, "[the album] does have a foot in a past FOB, but where they're taking you is somewhere you weren't expecting...they sound like Fall Out Boy again." Steven Loftin writing for The Line of Best Fit states, "So Much (For) Stardust's main takeaway is the palpable, radiating carefree joy. While there's no doubt Fall Out Boy have probably believed in their last 15 years' worth of output, this is the first time that actually feels like they're reaching into something truer to themselves."

Erica Campbell of NME feels that the album "[advances] their sound and [while also] acknowledging their roots." Sputnikmusic states that producer "[Neal Avron] strips away the suffocating layers of unnecessary production which choked all life out of Mania, restoring a freeing sense of dynamics and coaxing out the best performance from Stump in more than a decade." Neil McCormick of The Telegraph felt that if "[the] album had cut some of the filler, it could have been a stellar return to form."

In June 2023, Alternative Press published an unranked list of the top 25 albums of the year to date and included this release, calling it "a refined, angry, and classic work of pop-punk gold with smart lyrics, stirring instrumentals, and the head-banging rock that fans have been clamoring for".

== Commercial performance ==
So Much (for) Stardust debuted at number six on the US Billboard 200 chart dated April 8, 2023, selling 64,000 album-equivalent units. It is Fall Out Boy's seventh consecutive top-ten album. The album also reached the top ten in Australia, Germany, New Zealand, Scotland, South Africa and the United Kingdom.

== Track listing ==
All tracks are written by Fall Out Boy, except where noted.

So Much (for) Stardust track listing
| No. | Title | Writer(s) | Length |
|---|---|---|---|
| 1. | "Love from the Other Side" | | 4:39 |
| 2. | "Heartbreak Feels So Good" | | 3:37 |
| 3. | "Hold Me Like a Grudge" | | 3:35 |
| 4. | "Fake Out" | | 3:29 |
| 5. | "Heaven, Iowa" | | 3:56 |
| 6. | "So Good Right Now" | Fall Out Boy; Robert Byrd | 2:58 |
| 7. | "The Pink Seashell" (featuring Ethan Hawke) | Fall Out Boy; Hawke | 1:02 |
| 8. | "I Am My Own Muse" | | 3:45 |
| 9. | "Flu Game" | | 3:38 |
| 10. | "Baby Annihilation" | | 1:07 |
| 11. | "The Kintsugi Kid (Ten Years)" | | 3:55 |
| 12. | "What a Time to Be Alive" | | 3:42 |
| 13. | "So Much (for) Stardust" | | 4:51 |
| Total length: | | | 44:14 |

Digital deluxe edition bonus track
| No. | Title | Writer(s) | Length |
|---|---|---|---|
| 14. | "We Didn't Start the Fire" (Billy Joel cover) | Billy Joel; Wentz | 3:35 |
| Total length: | | | 47:56 |

Notes

- "So Good Right Now" contains interpolations from "Little Bitty Pretty One", written by Robert Byrd.
- "The Pink Seashell" features dialogue spoken by Hawke from the 1994 film Reality Bites.

== Personnel ==
Fall Out Boy

- Andy Hurley
- Joe Trohman
- Patrick Stump
- Pete Wentz

Additional musicians

- Bill Reichenbach Jr.– bass trombone, trombone (tracks 1, 8, 12, 13)
- Dan Fornero – flugelhorn, trumpet (tracks 1, 8, 12, 13)
- Wayne Bergeron – flugelhorn, trumpet (tracks 1, 8, 12, 13)
- London Metropolitan Orchestra (Note: The London Metropolitan Orchestra consists of conductor Andy Brown, orchestra leader Jerry Hey, orchestrator Jeff Toyne, leader Janice Graham, violin leader Mark Robertson, cellists David Low and Tim Loo, violists Jonathan Moerschel and Luke Maurer, and violinists Alyssa Park, Ben Jacobson, and Eun Mee Ahn.) – orchestra (tracks 1, 7, 8, 12, 13)
- Dan Higgins – woodwinds (tracks 1, 8, 12, 13)
- Julia Waters Tillman – choir (tracks 5, 9, 13)
- Luther Waters – choir (tracks 5, 9, 13)
- Maxine Waters Willard – choir (tracks 5, 9, 13)
- Oren Waters – choir (tracks 5, 9, 13)
- Ethan Hawke – vocals (track 7)
- Marvel Jane Love Wentz – additional vocals (track 11)

Technical

- Neal Avron – producer, mixing, engineer
- Erich Talaba – engineer
- Scott Skrzyski – engineer, assistant engineer
- Patrick Stump – engineer, arrangements
- Nate Haessly – assistant engineer
- Alex Miller – assistant engineer
- Meggie Lisha – assistant engineer
- Julia Anderson – assistant engineer
- Thea Prevalsky – assistant engineer
- Chris Gehringer – mastering
- Steve McLaughlin – orchestra recording engineer (tracks 1, 7, 8)

== Charts ==
=== Weekly charts ===
Weekly chart performance for So Much (for) Stardust
| Chart (2023) | Peak position |
|---|---|
| Australian Albums (ARIA) | 4 |
| Austrian Albums (Ö3 Austria) | 15 |
| Belgian Albums (Ultratop Flanders) | 42 |
| Belgian Albums (Ultratop Wallonia) | 61 |
| Canadian Albums (Billboard) | 13 |
| Dutch Albums (Album Top 100) | 91 |
| French Albums (SNEP) | 84 |
| German Albums (Offizielle Top 100) | 6 |
| Hungarian Albums (MAHASZ) | 17 |
| Irish Albums (Official Charts) | 3 |
| Japanese Albums (Oricon) | 39 |
| Japanese Digital Albums (Oricon) | 9 |
| Japanese Hot Albums (Billboard Japan) | 24 |
| New Zealand Albums (RMNZ) | 9 |
| Polish Albums (ZPAV) | 63 |
| Scottish Albums (Official Charts) | 2 |
| Spanish Albums (Promusicae) | 98 |
| Swiss Albums (Schweizer Hitparade) | 52 |
| UK Albums (Official Charts) | 3 |
| UK Rock & Metal Albums (Official Charts) | 1 |
| US Billboard 200 | 6 |
| US Top Alternative Albums (Billboard) | 2 |
| US Top Rock Albums (Billboard) | 1 |

=== Year-end charts ===
Year-end chart performance for So Much (for) Stardust
| Chart (2023) | Position |
|---|---|
| UK Cassette Albums (OCC) | 19 |
| US Top Current Album Sales (Billboard) | 52 |
| US Top Rock Albums (Billboard) | 46 |

== Certifications ==
Certifications for So Much (for) Stardust
| Region | Certification | Certified units/sales |
|---|---|---|
| United Kingdom (BPI) | Silver | 60,000^{‡} |
^{‡} Sales+streaming figures based on certification alone.
