= BRAIN (studio) =

American art studio

- Industry: Art
- Founded: 2023; 2 years ago
- Founders: Brian Moore; Mike Lacher
- Headquarters: Los Angeles, CA, United States
- Website: brain.wtf

BRAIN is an American art studio known for its viral collaborations with Weezer, Fall Out Boy, and Green Day, as well as its artificial intelligence project GOODY-2.

== History ==
In 2022, BRAIN created Human Record Player, a collaboration with the rock band Weezer, which required users to physically spin themselves in order to play the band's single "Records."

In 2023, the studio introduced CRYNYL, a limited-edition vinyl release of Fall Out Boy’s album So Much (for) Stardust, which included trace amounts of the band members’ tears mixed into the pressing material.

In early 2024, BRAIN launched GOODY-2, an AI chatbot that declined all user requests, citing potential ethical, legal, or safety concerns. The project was noted for its commentary on the balance between user agency and AI constraints.

In late 2024, the studio released Dookie Demastered, an official reissue of Green Day’s album ''Dookie''. Each track was issued on a distinct, unconventional playback medium—including a wax cylinder and a modified Teddy Ruxpin doll—and distributed through a drawing.
