= So Much (for) Stardust (song) =

Single by Fall Out Boy

from the album So Much (for) Stardust
- Released: February 28, 2024
- Length: 4:51; 3:55 (edit)
- Label: Fueled by Ramen; DCD2
- Composers: Pete Wentz; Patrick Stump; Joe Trohman; Andy Hurley
- Lyricist: Pete Wentz
- Producer: Neal Avron

Fall Out Boy singles chronology
"We Didn't Start the Fire" (2023)	"So Much (for) Stardust" (2024)	"It Feels Like Christmas" (2025)

Music video
- "So Much (for) Stardust" on YouTube

"So Much (for) Stardust" is a song by American rock band Fall Out Boy, released on February 28, 2024, through Fueled by Ramen and DCD2. It was released as the fourth single from the band's eighth studio album of the same name, So Much (for) Stardust.

== Music video ==
On February 28, 2024, the band released a music video the song, featuring NBA player Jimmy Butler.

== Personnel ==
Fall Out Boy

- Andy Hurley
- Joe Trohman
- Patrick Stump
- Pete Wentz

Additional personnel

- Neal Avron – production, mixing

== Charts ==
Chart performance for "So Much (for) Stardust"
Chart (2024)	Peak position
US Rock & Alternative Airplay (Billboard)	22
