= Young Wild Things Tour =

2007 concert tour by Fall Out Boy

The Young Wild Things Tour was a four-band fall 2007 arena concert tour by Fall Out Boy with supporting acts Gym Class Heroes, Plain White T's, Cute Is What We Aim For, and Doug (from November 9 on).

This is Fall Out Boy's biggest tour to date, grossing over $30 million. The tour sold out in five hours, with over 1.5 million tickets sold.

The tour was first announced on the Fall Out Boy website, but instead of the traditional method of announcing tour dates in the same release as the announcement of the tour itself, the bands chose an unusual method. Fans would text a certain number and would be given a code for their state/area. That code would then be entered on a website. After an unknown number of codes were entered, the tour date would be unlocked. The 31-date tour was only held in America, except for two Canadian dates. The tour began on October 18 and ran through December 2.

Inspired by Maurice Sendak's 1963 children's book Where the Wild Things Are, the concert tour included sets designed by artist Rob Dobi, containing images from the book. Fall Out Boy bassist Pete Wentz explained, "Where the Wild Things Are is a great narrative. It encapsulates pretty much every FOB song ever written: You know, tantrums and monster islands and all." "There's also a play on words of the young wild thing idea that everybody has with Hollywood and starlets right now."

== Tour dates ==
Date	City	Country	Venue
October 18, 2007	Columbus	United States	Value City Arena
October 19, 2007	Walker	United States	DeltaPlex Arena
October 20, 2007	Rosemont	United States	Allstate Arena
October 21, 2007	Champaign	United States	Assembly Hall
October 23, 2007	Austin	United States	Frank Irwin Center
October 24, 2007	Dallas	United States	Nokia Live at Grand Prairie
October 26, 2007	Oklahoma City	United States	Ford Center
October 27, 2007	Memphis	United States	Mud Island Amphitheater
October 28, 2007	New Orleans	United States	Voodoo Music Experience 2007
October 30, 2007	Jacksonville	United States	Jacksonville Veterans Memorial Arena
October 31, 2007	Miami Beach	United States	Fillmore Miami Beach
November 1, 2007	Orlando	United States	UCF Arena
November 2, 2007	Orange Beach	United States	The Wharf Amphitheater
November 3, 2007	Duluth	United States	Arena at Gwinnett Center
November 4, 2007	Clemson	United States	Littlejohn Coliseum
November 6, 2007	Nashville	United States	Nashville Municipal Auditorium
November 7, 2007	Roanoke	United States	Roanoke Civic Center
November 9, 2007	Lowell	United States	Tsongas Arena
November 10, 2007	Bridgeport	United States	Arena at Harbor Yard
November 11, 2007	Fairfax	United States	Patriot Center
November 13, 2007	Philadelphia	United States	Wachovia Spectrum
November 14, 2007	New York City	United States	Madison Square Garden
November 16, 2007	Ottawa	Canada	Scotiabank Place
November 17, 2007	London	Canada	John Labatt Centre
November 18, 2007	Rochester	United States	Blue Cross Arena
November 20, 2007	Auburn Hills	United States	The Palace at Auburn Hills
November 21, 2007	Cedar Rapids	United States	US Cellular Center
November 23, 2007	Denver	United States	Magness Arena
November 24, 2007	Rio Rancho	United States	Santa Ana Star Center
November 26, 2007	Glendale	United States	Jobing.com Arena
November 27, 2007	Los Angeles	United States	The Forum
November 29, 2007	San Jose	United States	Event Center Arena
November 30, 2007	Sacramento	United States	ARCO Arena (referred to as KDND 107.9 Jingle Ball Night #1)
December 1, 2007	San Diego	United States	San Diego Sports Arena
December 2, 2007	Las Vegas	United States	The Joint
