= We Didn't Start the Fire (Fall Out Boy song) =

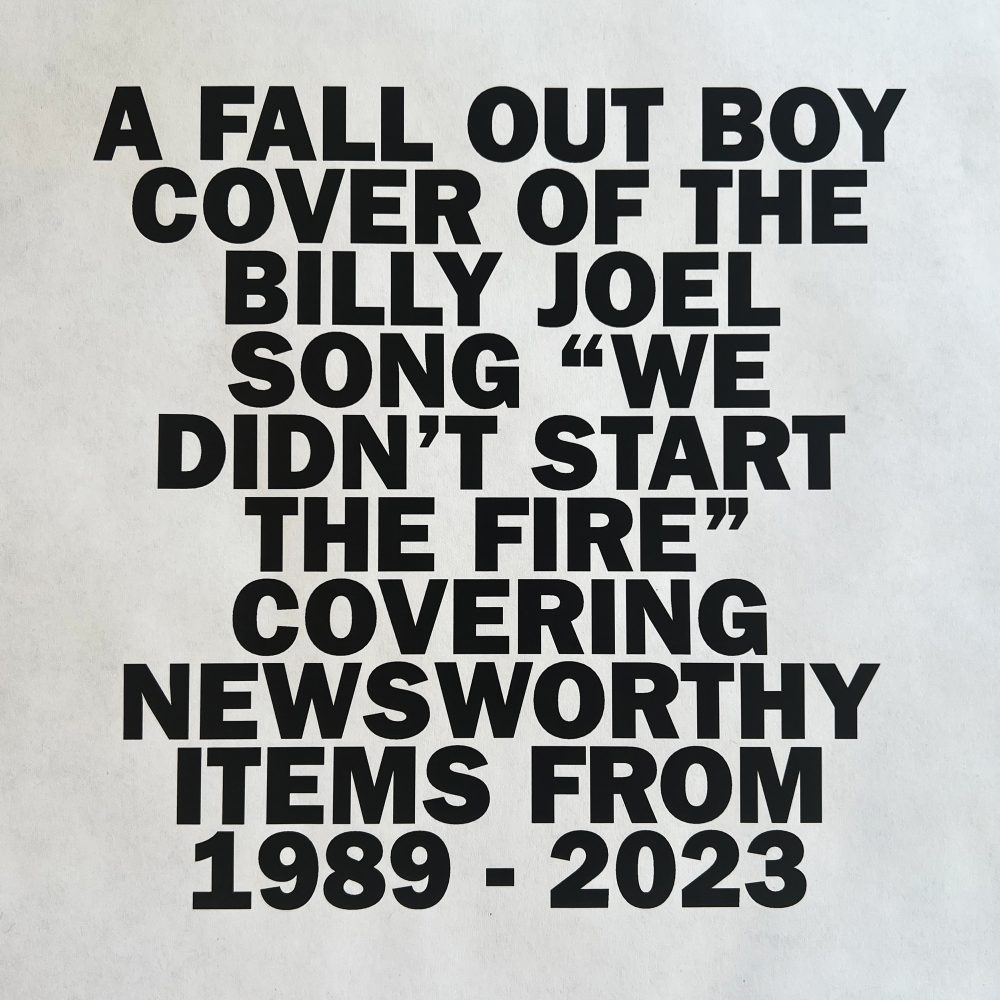

Single by Fall Out Boy

from the album So Much (for) Stardust (Digital Deluxe edition)
- Released: June 28, 2023
- Length: 3:35
- Label: Fueled by Ramen; Elektra
- Songwriters: Billy Joel; Pete Wentz
- Producer: Neal Avron

Fall Out Boy singles chronology
"Hold Me Like a Grudge" (2023)	"We Didn't Start the Fire" (2023)	"So Much (for) Stardust" (2024)

Lyric video
- "We Didn't Start the Fire" on YouTube

"We Didn't Start the Fire" is a 2023 single by American rock band Fall Out Boy, which was included as a digital bonus track in the band's eighth studio album, So Much (for) Stardust. It is a cover of Billy Joel's 1989 song of the same name, updating the song's cultural references to span the years since the original was released. Critics reacted negatively to the song, panning the tone and content of its updated lyrics.

== Composition ==
"We Didn't Start the Fire", like Billy Joel's original version released in 1989, is a catalog of major events in world history through a certain time period. Joel's original mainly centers around the events during and surrounding the Cold War, and Fall Out Boy's version continues where Joel's ends, covering the events from 1989 to 2023. Fall Out Boy's version includes references to Woodstock 99, the 1992 Los Angeles riots, the Oklahoma City bombing, 9/11, Brexit; the Boston Marathon bombing, Bush v. Gore, the assassination of Shinzo Abe; the death of Michael Jackson, the Arab Spring, the Fukushima nuclear accident and MySpace, which Stereogum notes was connected to the band's rise to fame. In the chorus, the original lyric "we tried to fight it" is replaced with "we're trying to fight it", and in the bridge, "it will still burn on and on…" is replaced with "it will still go on and on…".

In a deviation from the original, Fall Out Boy's updated lyrics abandon chronological ordering, at one point referencing Rodney King next to deepfakes. Pete Wentz explained the choice in an interview with Zane Lowe:

Listen, we did our best. It's very, very, very difficult. His is not totally in chronological order, but it's more in chronological order than ours. We just wanted the JFK blown away line, and clearly, I think that the World Trade one was a little more… that was probably… People probably felt a similar way. You remember where you were or whatever. So it's just a little bit out of order, but it is what it is. Listen, we wanted the Internet to still have something to complain about.

The COVID-19 pandemic is notably absent from the song; Wentz cites the event's ubiquity and the need for rhyme space for Bush v. Gore in explaining why it was not included.

== Critical response ==
The band's version of "We Didn't Start the Fire" was met with a mocking and negative reaction from critics. Chris DeVille with Stereogum wrote "Well, this is happening"; the staff of Slate wrote "Move over, Gal Gadot's 'Imagine'!"; and Alexandra del Rosario with the Los Angeles Times wrote "sugar, it isn't goin' down well with some fans". James Rettig with Stereogum described the song as "abominable" and Owen S. Good with Polygon described it as "tasteless" for rhyming "George Floyd" with "Metroid." Reviewers also criticized the song's omission of several notable events and people; Lyndsey Parker with Yahoo! Entertainment noted the lack of the COVID-19 pandemic, as well as David Bowie, Bill Clinton, and Hillary Clinton; the staff of Slate brought up the film Titanic and O. J. Simpson as missing elements. Morgan Hines with USA Today and del Rosario described reaction on social media as mixed and controversial.

When asked about the cover, Billy Joel said: "Everybody's been wanting to know when there's going to be an updated version of it, because my song started in '49 and ended in '89 — it was a 40-year span. Everybody said, 'Well, aren't you going to do a part two?' I said, 'Nah, I've already done part one.' So, Fall Out Boy, go ahead. Great, take it away."

== In popular culture ==
The cover was referenced in the 2025 TV episode "The Gang F***s Up Abbott Elementary", the season 17 premiere of It's Always Sunny in Philadelphia, where the characters write an updated version of "We Didn't Start the Fire" without being aware that Fall Out Boy did it first.

== Charts ==
=== Weekly charts ===
Weekly chart performance for "We Didn't Start the Fire"
Chart (2023–24)	Peak position
Australia Digital Tracks (ARIA)	5
Canada Hot 100 (Billboard)	85
Canada Rock (Billboard)	48
Japan Hot Overseas (Billboard)	20
New Zealand Hot Singles (RMNZ)	8
UK Singles (Official Charts)	52
US Billboard Hot 100	94
US Hot Rock & Alternative Songs (Billboard)	6
US Rock & Alternative Airplay (Billboard)	4
US Adult Contemporary (Billboard)	16
US Adult Pop Airplay (Billboard)	10
US Pop Airplay (Billboard)	26

=== Year-end charts ===
2023 year-end chart performance for "We Didn't Start the Fire"
Chart (2023)	Position
US Digital Song Sales (Billboard)	69
US Hot Rock & Alternative Songs (Billboard)	33
US Rock Airplay (Billboard)	29

2024 year-end chart performance for "We Didn't Start the Fire"
Chart (2024)	Position
US Rock Airplay (Billboard)	21

== Certifications ==
Region	Certification	Certified units/sales
United States (RIAA)	Gold	500,000^{‡}
^{‡} Sales+streaming figures based on certification alone.
