= Heartbreak Feels So Good =

- Cover art for the Dillon Francis remix

Single by Fall Out Boy

from the album So Much (for) Stardust
- Released: January 25, 2023
- Genre: Pop rock; emo
- Length: 3:37
- Label: Fueled by Ramen; DCD2
- Composers: Pete Wentz; Patrick Stump; Joe Trohman; Andy Hurley
- Lyricist: Pete Wentz
- Producer: Neal Avron

Fall Out Boy singles chronology
"Love from the Other Side" (2023)	"Heartbreak Feels So Good" (2023)	"Hold Me Like a Grudge" (2023)

Music video
- "Heartbreak Feels So Good" on YouTube

"Heartbreak Feels So Good" is a song by American rock band Fall Out Boy, released on January 25, 2023, through Fueled by Ramen and DCD2. It was released as the second single from the band's eighth studio album, So Much (for) Stardust.

== Background ==
Teasing the song, the band posted a photo of a package with a set of coordinates leading to the Field of Dreams movie filming site in Dyersville, Iowa. The package contained another seashell marked 2 of 13 with a letter, this time printed was the date January 25, 2023, and a speculated song title "Heartbreak Feels So Good". On January 23, 2023, the band announced the next single, "Heartbreak Feels So Good", released on January 25, 2023, with promotion featuring actress Nicole Kidman's advertisements for AMC Theatres.

== Composition ==
Starr Bowenbank of Billboard described "Heartbreak Feels So Good" as a "rock track." Brandon Flores of Blast Out Your Stereo called the song a "light-hearted pop-rock tune". Wren Graves of Consequence noted that the song contains "dark synths and high, muted guitars", while Chad Childers of Loudwire stated that it "embraces the band's emo nature".

== Music video ==
The music video was directed by Whitey McConnaughy and features Rivers Cuomo of Weezer where Fall Out Boy film a prank involving "kidnapping" Cuomo.

== Personnel ==
Fall Out Boy

- Andy Hurley
- Joe Trohman
- Patrick Stump
- Pete Wentz

Additional personnel

- Neal Avron – production, mixing

== Charts ==
Chart performance for "Heartbreak Feels So Good"
Chart (2023)	Peak position
UK Singles Sales (OCC)	76
UK Singles Downloads (OCC)	73
UK Rock & Metal (OCC)	17
US Hot Rock & Alternative Songs (Billboard)	50
