= BarkleyOKRP =

Kansas City, Missouri based full-service advertising agency

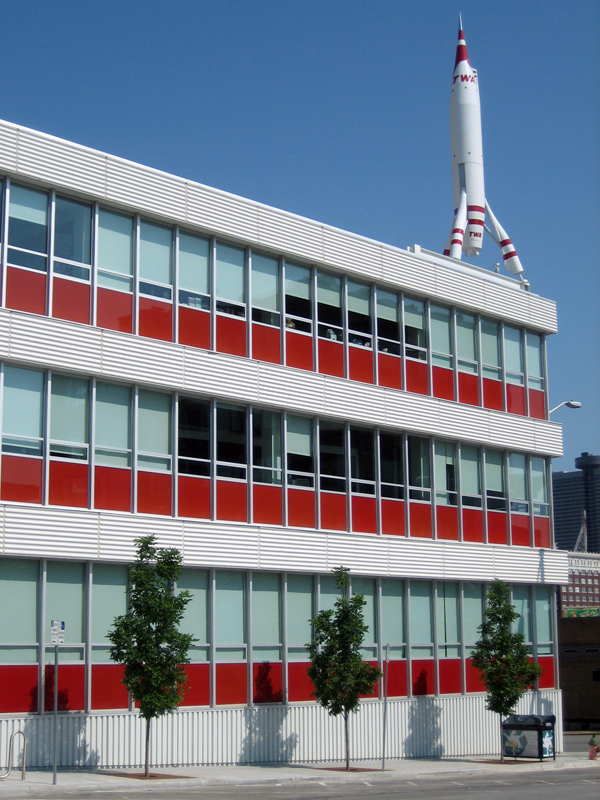
- Barkley's headquarters in the Crossroads Art District of Kansas City
- Formerly: Barkley Evergreen & Partners
- Founded: 1964; 62 years ago
- Headquarters: Kansas City, Missouri
- Website: barkleyokrp.com

BarkleyOKRP (formerly Barkley Evergreen & Partners and Barkley) is a full-service independent advertising agency headquartered in Kansas City, Missouri. Founded in 1964, the agency has worked with clients such as Sonic Drive-In, Planet Fitness, and Dairy Queen. Its services include advertising, brand strategy, creative development, media planning, and digital marketing. Barkley is the largest independent advertising agency in Kansas City, and was ranked seventh-largest in the U.S.

In 2024, Barkley merged with Chicago-based OKRP to form BarkleyOKRP, and Katy Hornady serves as the company's CEO.

== History ==
Barkley was founded in 1964 in Kansas City, Missouri, by Bill Fromm. The agency was previously known as Barkley Evergreen & Partners before adopting the Barkley name.

Barkley acquired Pittsburgh-based Ripple Effects Interactive in March 2008. Ripple was rebranded BarkleyREI.

Barkley announced the acquisition of Callahan, a Lawrence-based ad agency. In September that same year, Keystone Capital, Inc. announced its investment in Barkley, the Kansas City metro area’s third-largest advertising agency.

In 2024, Barkley merged with Chicago-based OKRP to form BarkleyOKRP. Their current CEO is Katy Hornady, she is succeeded by Jeff King, who led the agency for over 16 years. King has since transitioned into the role of founding partner.
