= Nicole Kidman AMC Theatres commercial =

2021 movie theatre commercial

We Make Movies Better
- Kidman seated and lit from behind by colorful lights emanating from a movie projector. A raised platform was constructed inside the theater to achieve this effect.
- Agency: Barkley Inc.
- Client: AMC Theatres
- Market: United States; Europe
- Language: English
- Running time: 60 seconds; 30 seconds; 15 seconds
- Product: Movie theaters
- Release date: September 2021
- Written by: Billy Ray
- Directed by: Jeff Cronenweth; Tim Cronenweth
- Starring: Nicole Kidman
- Production company: Wondros for AMC; Elvis for Odeon
- Budget: $25+ million

In September 2021, AMC Theatres began airing a commercial starring actress Nicole Kidman in its theaters and on television. The ad, written by screenwriter Billy Ray, was intended to spur theater attendance following the COVID-19 pandemic by highlighting the "magic" of the movie theater experience. In the ad, Kidman enters and sits alone in an empty AMC theater while delivering a monologue describing in heightened language the pleasures of the moviegoing experience, such as the "indescribable feeling we get when the lights begin to dim and we go somewhere we've never been before". The commercial became a surprise hit among audiences, who came to appreciate the unintentional campiness of its earnestly rhapsodic style and script, particularly the line "Somehow, heartbreak feels good in a place like this". It has inspired internet memes, parodies, and in-theatre audience participation rituals.

== Description ==
External videos
- The full 60 second version of the commercial via YouTube

The ad begins outside an AMC cineplex, with a shot of high-heeled shoes stepping through a puddle, reflecting an illuminated "AMC" sign. Kidman lowers an oversized ("Jedi-like") hood and enters the building, making her way into an empty theater. She takes her seat, the lights dim, and clips from a number of films appear onscreen before her, including Star Wars: The Force Awakens (2015), Jurassic World (2015), Wonder Woman (2017), La La Land (2016) and Creed (2015). Throughout the 60-second spot, Kidman delivers a rhapsodic monologue on the pleasures of the moviegoing experience, partly via voice-over and partly delivered straight to camera. The commercial ends with the AMC Theatres logo and the tagline "We make movies better". Throughout the ad, Kidman wears a gray-blue suit with shiny silver pinstripes. The 30 and 15-second versions change the films Kidman watches on the screen, including Spider-Man: Into the Spider-Verse (2018) and A Star is Born (2018). The 2024 update changed the films to Elvis and Avatar: The Way of Water (both 2022).

== Production ==
The commercial was directed by brothers Jeff Cronenweth and Tim Cronenweth. Kidman suggested the duo after having worked with Jeff Cronenweth on the 2021 film Being the Ricardos. Kidman also selected friend and screenwriter Billy Ray to write the commercial's script. Kidman had previously worked with Ray on the 2015 film Secret in Their Eyes. Barkley Inc. worked with AMC on the campaign.

The ad was shot at the AMC cineplex in Porter Ranch, a suburb north of Los Angeles. An elevated platform was constructed for Kidman to sit on to achieve a shot where beams of light from the movie projector play around her head.

The ad was conceived at a time when AMC Theatres, and movie theaters as a whole, appeared to be in a precarious situation, with audience numbers still far below levels from before the COVID-19 pandemic (see Impact of the COVID-19 pandemic on cinema). Kidman's husband Keith Urban explained that it was "a no-brainer" for Kidman to participate in the commercial since "she loves movies" and it was a way to help theater because of the pandemic. According to Variety, AMC spent $25 million on the ad campaign, with television airtime being the highest expense.

The 60-second commercial was also edited down to 30 and 15-second versions.

== Release ==
The ad began airing on television in September 2021. It was also played at AMC 600 United States theater locations, as well as in nine European countries through Odeon Cinemas Group after the coming attractions. According to AMC, this was the first national ad campaign from a movie theater chain.

== Impact ==
The commercial's grand style and the earnest melodrama of Kidman's monologue has led the commercial to be appreciated as an artifact of camp. The commercial has been the subject of internet memes, parodies, merchandise, and audience participation rituals.

The line "Somehow, heartbreak feels good in a place like this" has been singled out as particularly memorable. Reflecting later on the commercial's impact, Billy Ray stated that this was "the best line I ever wrote".

In-person demonstrations of affection for the ad by theater-goers have included cheering (particularly at the line "Somehow, heartbreak feels good in a place like this"), saluting, and reciting the script in time with Kidman. According to Vanity Fair, fans of the ad have also created shirts with Kidman's face on them, mash-up videos, TikToks, and even an eight-minute shot-by-shot analysis. The outfit Kidman is wearing in the ad has also become a very popular meme and become quite popular to dress up as during 2022. According to Vulture, it was one of the "Best Meme Halloween Costumes" of 2022.

According to Ray, the chairman of AMC reported observing these unexpected audience reactions within weeks of the ad's debut. A significant indicator of the commercial's cult following came in December 2021 when AMC began showing a reduced 30-second version in theaters in conjunction with the release of Spider-Man: No Way Home, which omitted the "heartbreak" line. The decision sparked outraged responses from fans, including a jocular Change.org petition demanding that AMC restore the "Kidman cut" (an allusion to the "Snyder cut" campaign). AMC relented and returned to showing the full-length version. Kidman expressed surprise upon hearing of the ad's following in a January 2022 interview. Urban noted that he and Kidman never expected "in a million years... that [it would] be this cultural thing".

On October 1, 2022, the commercial was parodied on the season 48 premiere of NBC's Saturday Night Live, with Chloe Fineman as Kidman. The sketch received strong positive response from viewers and fans, who praised its faithfulness to the commercial.

At the 95th Academy Awards, host Jimmy Kimmel included a joke about the ad during his opening monologue. In September 2023, an online trailer for Saw X parodied the ad, with Billy the Puppet (voiced by Tobin Bell) in Kidman's place and watching scenes from the film in the theater. Shortly after it went viral online, Lionsgate received a takedown notice, according to Josh Stolberg.

The opening segment of Live with Kelly and Mark's 2024 "After the Oscars" show parodies the commercial, with hosts Kelly Ripa and Mark Consuelos in Kidman's place watching themselves on the screen starring in parodies of Barbie (2023), The Princess Bride (1987), A Few Good Men (1992), Basic Instinct (1992) and Dirty Dancing (1987).

In 2024, after Kidman was selected as the recipient of the AFI Life Achievement Award, actor Morgan Freeman filmed a parody of the ad with TNT to promote the ceremony.

== 2024 update ==
Kidman's commercial was initially set to run until August 2022, for the duration of her one year contract as spokesperson for AMC. In August 2022, AMC's CEO Adam Aron announced that Kidman would be signed as spokesperson for another year. Later the same month, Billy Ray stated that he had written a script for a follow-up, describing it as taking a "very different approach that is a little bit of a wink to the one we've already done". By May 2023, a version of another commercial had been written, but Aron was uncertain if that would result in the final product. Aron added that AMC hoped to have the new commercial debut later in 2023 or in 2024 and hoped it would "live up to [audience's] expectations". Beginning March 1, 2024, AMC introduced three new 30-second versions of the commercials that would appear before films, on a rotating basis; this was meant to replace the 60-second version that had been in use for the previous four years.
