= Hold Me Like a Grudge =

Single by Fall Out Boy

from the album So Much (for) Stardust
- Released: March 24, 2023
- Genre: Disco-funk; pop rock
- Length: 3:35
- Label: Fueled by Ramen; DCD2
- Composers: Pete Wentz; Patrick Stump; Joe Trohman; Andy Hurley
- Lyricist: Pete Wentz
- Producer: Neal Avron

Fall Out Boy singles chronology
"Heartbreak Feels So Good" (2023)	"Hold Me Like a Grudge" (2023)	"We Didn't Start the Fire" (2023)

Music video
- "Hold Me Like a Grudge" on YouTube

"Hold Me Like a Grudge" is a song by American rock band Fall Out Boy, released on March 24, 2023, through Fueled by Ramen and DCD2. It was released as the third single from the band's eighth studio album, So Much (for) Stardust, the same day as the album.

== Background ==
On March 13, 2023, the band announced that "Hold Me Like a Grudge" would be the next single of the album. Two days later, a clip of the song was shared. On March 23, the band premiered the song on The Tonight Show.

== Composition ==
"Hold Me Like a Grudge" has been described as disco-funk and pop rock, "with [a] hip-swinging-bassline".

== Accolades ==
Awards and nominations for "Hold Me Like a Grudge"
Organization	Year	Category	Result	Ref.
MTV Video Music Awards	2023	Best Alternative	Nominated	

== Music video ==
On March 24, the same day the album was released, the band released a music video for "Hold Me Like a Grudge". The video is a continuation of the music video for the band's song, "This Ain't a Scene, It's an Arms Race". Pete Wentz called it "the most ambitious music video that we’ve attempted to make in the past 10 years."

== Personnel ==
Fall Out Boy

- Andy Hurley
- Joe Trohman
- Patrick Stump
- Pete Wentz

Additional personnel

- Neal Avron – production, mixing

== Charts ==
=== Weekly charts ===
Weekly chart performance for "Hold Me Like a Grudge"
Chart (2023)	Peak position
UK Singles (Official Charts)	91
UK Rock & Metal (OCC)	8
US Hot Rock & Alternative Songs (Billboard)	25
US Rock & Alternative Airplay (Billboard)	16

=== Year-end charts ===
Year-end chart performance for "Hold Me Like a Grudge"
Chart (2023)	Position
US Alternative Airplay (Billboard)	29

== Release history ==
Release history for "Hold Me Like a Grudge"
Region	Date	Format	Label	Ref.
Various	March 24, 2023	Digital download; streaming	Fueled by Ramen; DCD2	
United States	June 6, 2023	Alternative radio	FBR; Elektra; 3EE	
