= Love from the Other Side =

Single by Fall Out Boy

from the album So Much (for) Stardust
- Released: January 18, 2023
- Genre: Pop rock; pop-punk; symphonic rock
- Length: 4:39 (album version); 4:07 (single edit)
- Label: Fueled by Ramen; DCD2
- Composers: Pete Wentz; Patrick Stump; Joe Trohman; Andy Hurley
- Lyricist: Pete Wentz
- Producer: Neal Avron

Fall Out Boy singles chronology
"Hand Crushed by a Mallet (remix)" (2019)	"Love from the Other Side" (2023)	"Heartbreak Feels So Good" (2023)

Music video
- "Love from the Other Side" on YouTube

"Love from the Other Side" is a song by American rock band Fall Out Boy, released on January 18, 2023, through Fueled by Ramen and DCD2. It was released as the lead single from the band's eighth studio album, So Much (for) Stardust.

== Background ==
In December 2022, the band released began teasing a new song with claymation animation. The band also created a website called sendingmylovefromtheotherside.com. "Love from the Other Side" was announced on January 11, 2023. The song was released on January 18 and the band confirmed the album title, So Much (for) Stardust, and release date for March 24, 2023. The song marks a return to releasing music under Fueled by Ramen, with their last release under the label being Take This to Your Grave. It was also announced that the song and album were produced by Neal Avron, making it the first time Fall Out Boy had worked with him since Folie à Deux.

Vocalist Patrick Stump discussed choosing the song as the lead single:

“I don’t know (laughs). I was surprised when that got suggested. Management were like, ‘Other Side!’ and I was like, ‘Really?!’ Label were like, ‘Other Side!” I was like, ‘Really?!’ I guess I assumed that it was not streamlined enough or pop enough, and I assumed it had to be more straight ahead or something... so I was really happy when everybody picked the song. It’s kinda become a running gag that I don’t know what ‘the’ song is. Any time I'm like, ‘I love that song! That’s the song!’ Everyone’s like, ‘Eeeeh, yeah it's okay…’”

On the same day the song was released, lead guitarist Joe Trohman announced that he would be taking a break from the band to focus on his mental health, and would return to the band in the future.

== Composition ==
Jack Rogers of Rock Sound described the song as "a guitar-driven piece of modern pop-rock brilliance." Gil Kaufman of Billboard felt the song had "pop-punk energy". Alessandro DeCaro of Alternative Press described the song as "anthemic rock", harkening back to the band's earlier material, such as Infinity on High and Folie à Deux. Taylor Ruckle of Flood Magazine called the song "transcendent symphonic rock."

== Accolades ==
Awards and nominations for "Love from the Other Side"
Organization	Year	Category	Result	Ref.
MTV Video Music Awards	2023	Best Visual Effects	Nominated	

== Promotion ==
=== TV performances ===
The band performed "Love from the Other Side" on Jimmy Kimmel Live! the same day it was released. The song was performed alongside "My Songs Know What You Did in the Dark (Light Em Up)" and "Centuries" at the 2023 NHL All Star Game on February 4, 2023.

== Commercial performance ==
"Love from the Other Side" peaked at number 67 on the UK Singles Sales Chart. The song reached number one the Billboard Alternative Airplay chart in the week ending March 4, 2023. Fall Out Boy broke the record for the longest wait between their debut on Alternative Airplay and their first number one on the chart, as "Love from the Other Side" peaked 17 years and 9 months after their debut entry with "Sugar, We're Goin Down" in June 2005.

== Track listing ==
All tracks are written by Patrick Stump, Joe Trohman, Pete Wentz, Andy Hurley.

Digital download
No.	Title	Length
1.	"Love from the Other Side"	4:39
2.	"Love from the Other Side - Edit"	4:07

== Personnel ==
Fall Out Boy

- Andy Hurley
- Joe Trohman
- Patrick Stump
- Pete Wentz

Additional Musicians

- Bill Reichenbach Jr. – bass trombone, trombone
- Dan Fornero – flugelhorn, trumpet
- Wayne Bergeron – flugelhorn, trumpet
- London Metropolitan Orchestra – orchestra
- Dan Higgins – woodwinds

Additional personnel

- Neal Avron – production, mixing

== Charts ==
=== Weekly charts ===
Weekly chart performance for "Love from the Other Side"
Chart (2023)	Peak position
Australia Digital Tracks (ARIA)	49
Canada Rock (Billboard)	28
Czech Republic Airplay (ČNS IFPI)	19
Japan Hot Overseas (Billboard)	15
New Zealand Hot Singles (RMNZ)	23
UK Singles (Official Charts)	68
UK Rock & Metal (Official Charts)	2
US Bubbling Under Hot 100 (Billboard)	10
US Hot Rock & Alternative Songs (Billboard)	11
US Pop Airplay (Billboard)	40
US Rock & Alternative Airplay (Billboard)	2

=== Year-end charts ===
Year-end chart performance for "Love from the Other Side"
Chart (2023)	Position
US Hot Rock & Alternative Songs (Billboard)	55
US Rock Airplay (Billboard)	3
