= Fall Out Boy =

American rock band

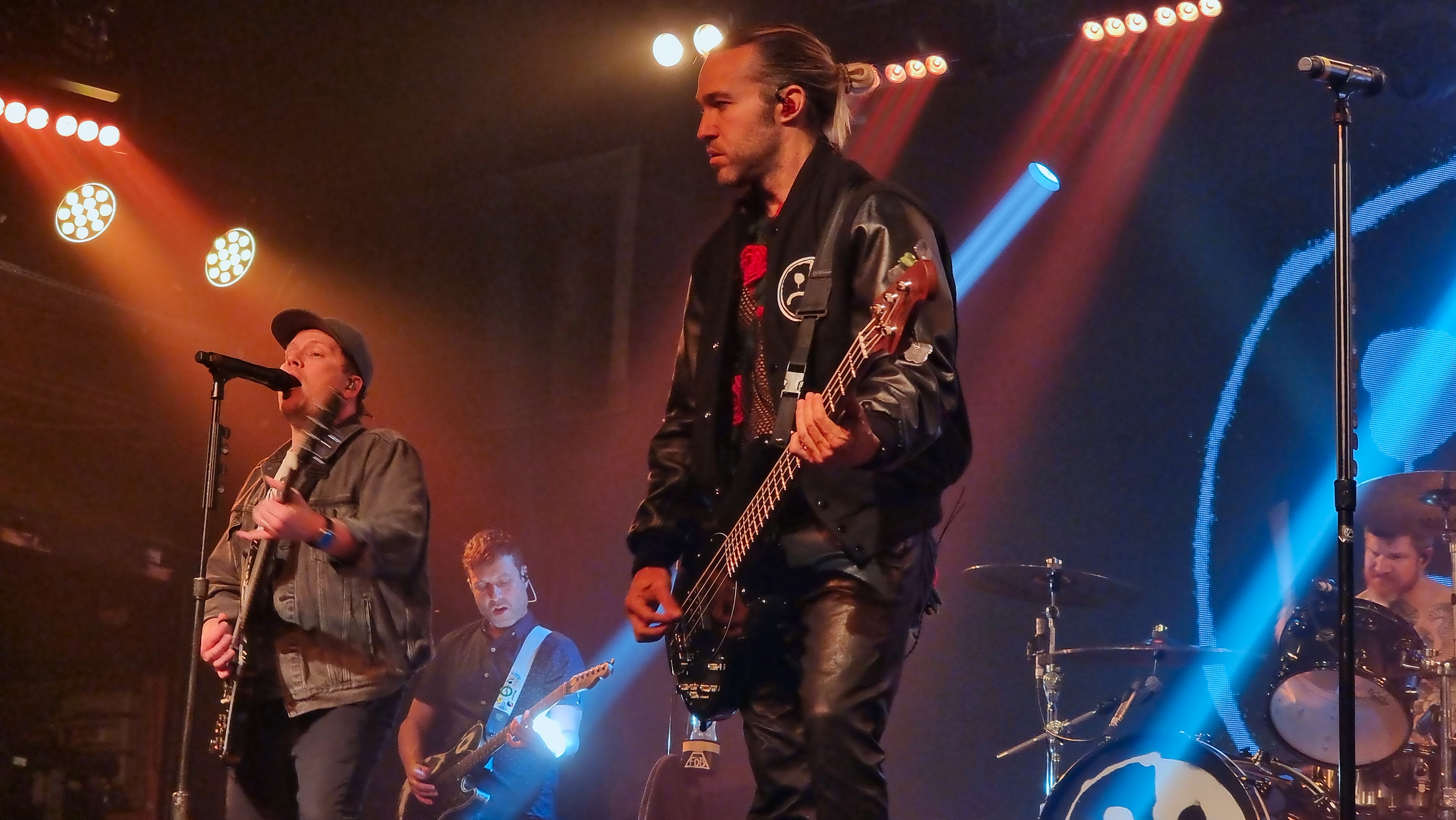
- Fall Out Boy performing at Heaven, London in 2023. (L–R) Patrick Stump, touring musician Ben Young, Pete Wentz, and Andy Hurley.

Background information
- Also known as: Forget Me Not; Saved Latin; Frosty and the Nightmare Making Machine
- Origin: Wilmette, Illinois, U.S.
- Genres: Pop-punk; pop rock; emo; alternative rock
- Works: Discography; songs
- Years active: 2001–2009; 2013–present
- Labels: Uprising; Fueled by Ramen; Island; DCD2; PAX AM
- Spinoffs: The Damned Things; Burning Empires; SECT; Black Cards
- Spinoff of: Arma Angelus; Racetraitor
- Members: Patrick Stump; Joe Trohman; Pete Wentz; Andy Hurley
- Past members: Ben Rose; John Flamandan; Mike Pareskuwicz; T.J. Kunasch; Brandon Hamm
- Website: falloutboy.com

Fall Out Boy is an American rock band formed in Wilmette, Illinois, a suburb of Chicago, in 2001. The band consists of lead vocalist and guitarist Patrick Stump, bassist Pete Wentz, guitarist Joe Trohman, and drummer Andy Hurley. The band originated from Chicago's hardcore punk scene and was formed by Wentz and Trohman as a pop-punk side project; Stump joined shortly thereafter. The group went through a succession of drummers before Hurley joined. Their debut album, Take This to Your Grave (2003), became an underground success and helped the band gain a dedicated fan base through heavy touring.

With Wentz as the band's lyricist and Stump as the primary composer, Fall Out Boy's 2005 major-label breakthrough, From Under the Cork Tree, produced two hit singles, "Sugar, We're Goin Down" and "Dance, Dance". It went double platinum, transforming the group into superstars and making Wentz a celebrity and tabloid fixture. Fall Out Boy received a Best New Artist nomination at the 2006 Grammy Awards. Infinity on High (2007) debuted at number one on the Billboard 200 with 260,000 first week sales. It produced two worldwide hit singles, "This Ain't a Scene, It's an Arms Race" and "Thnks fr th Mmrs". Their following album, Folie à Deux (2008), was a commercial disappointment and received a mixed response. Following the release of Believers Never Die – Greatest Hits in 2009, the band went on hiatus and the members worked on side projects.

The band reunited with Save Rock and Roll (2013), which became Fall Out Boy's second number-one album, and included the top 20 single "My Songs Know What You Did in the Dark (Light Em Up)". The same year, the band released the EP PAX AM Days, consisting of eight punk-influenced tracks that were recorded during a two-day session with producer Ryan Adams. The band's sixth studio album, American Beauty/American Psycho (2015) peaked at number one on the Billboard 200, and spawned the top-10 hit "Centuries" and the single "Uma Thurman" which reached No. 22 on the Billboard Hot 100. This was followed by their first remix album Make America Psycho Again, which featured remixes of all original tracks from American Beauty/American Psycho by a different artist on each song, including Migos and Wiz Khalifa.

The band's seventh studio album Mania (2018), also peaked at No. 1, making it the band's fourth No. 1 album and sixth consecutive Top 10 album. The Mania tour included a show at Wrigley Field, marking their first headlining stadium show. In 2018, Fall Out Boy also received their second Grammy nomination for Best Rock Album for Mania. On January 18, 2023, the group announced its eighth studio album, So Much (for) Stardust, which was released on March 24.

== History ==
=== 2001–2002: Early years ===
Fall Out Boy was formed in 2001 in the Chicago suburb of Wilmette, Illinois by friends Pete Wentz and Joe Trohman. Wentz was a "visible fixture" of the relatively small Chicago hardcore scene of the late 1990s, performing in groups such as Birthright, Extinction and First Born. He was also part of the metalcore band Arma Angelus and the more political Racetraitor, "a band that managed to land the covers of Maximumrocknroll and Heartattack fanzines before releasing a single note of music". Wentz was growing dissatisfied with the changing mores of the community, which he viewed as a transition from political activism to an emphasis on moshing and breakdowns. With enthusiasm in Arma Angelus waning, he created a pop-punk side project with Trohman that was intended to be "easy and escapist". Patrick Stump was the drummer for grindcore band Xgrinding processX and a host of other bands that "never really managed." At a Borders bookstore in Wilmette, while Trohman was discussing Neurosis with a friend, Stump interrupted them to correct their classification of the band; the ensuing conversation soon shifted to Trohman and Wentz's new project. Stump, viewing it as an opportunity to try out with "local hardcore celebrity" Wentz, directed Trohman to his MP3.com page, which contained sung-through acoustic recordings. Stump intended to try out as a drummer, but Trohman urged him to bring out his acoustic guitar; Stump impressed Trohman and Wentz with songs from Saves the Day's Through Being Cool. While Wentz wanted Racetraitor bandmate Andy Hurley to join the group as drummer, Hurley appeared uninterested and too busy at the time.

The band's first public performance came in a cafeteria at DePaul University alongside Stilwell and another group that performed Black Sabbath's self-titled debut album in its entirety. The band's only performance with guitarist John Flamandan and original drummer Ben Rose was in retrospect described as "goofy" and "bad", but Trohman made an active effort to make the band work, picking up members for practice. During this performance, they introduced themselves as Forget Me Not. Wentz and Stump argued over band names; the former favored verbose, tongue-in-cheek names, while the latter wanted to reference Tom Waits in name. After creating a short list of names that included "Fall Out Boy", a fictional character from The Simpsons and Bongo Comics, friends voted on the name. The band's second performance, at a southern Illinois university with the Killing Tree, began with Wentz introducing the band under a name Stump recalled as "very long". According to Stump, an audience member yelled out, "Fuck that, no, you're Fall Out Boy!", and the band were credited later in the show under that name by Killing Tree frontman Tim McIlrath. As the group looked up to McIlrath, and Trohman and Stump were "die-hard" Simpsons fans, the name stuck. The group's first cassette tape demo was recorded in Ben Rose's basement, but the band later set off for Wisconsin to record a proper demo with 7 Angels 7 Plagues drummer Jared Logan, whom Wentz knew through connections in the hardcore scene.

Several more members passed through the group, including drummer Mike Pareskuwicz of Subsist and guitarist T.J. "Racine" Kunasch. While Stump at this point felt uninterested in the group, Wentz, according to Uprising Records owner Sean Muttaqi, viewed the group as "the thing that would make him famous. He had a clear vision." Wentz was "singularly focused on taking things to the next level" and began promoting the band via early social media. Muttaqi got word of the demo and wanted to release half of it as a split extended play with Hurley's band Project Rocket, which the band viewed as competition. Uprising wanted to release an album with the emerging band, which had only written three songs at that point. With the help of Logan, the group attempted to put together a collection of songs in two days and recorded them as Fall Out Boy's Evening Out with Your Girlfriend. The rushed recording experience and underdeveloped songs left the band dissatisfied. When the band set off to Smart Studios in Madison, Wisconsin to record three songs for a possible split 7-inch with 504 Plan, engineer Sean O'Keefe suggested the band record the songs with Hurley. Hurley was recording an EP with his new group the Kill Pill in Chicago on the same day, but raced to Madison to play drums for Fall Out Boy. "It was still a fill-in thing but when Andy sat in, it just felt different. It was one of those 'a-ha' moments", recalled Wentz.

=== 2003–2004: Early success and Take This to Your Grave ===
The band booked a two-week tour with Spitalfield, but Pareskuwicz was unable to get time off from work and Kunasch was kicked out of the band as the group "had all gotten sick of him". Kunasch was temporarily replaced by friend Brandon Hamm on guitar, alongside drummer Chris Envy from the recently disbanded Showoff, but both quit prior to the kickoff of the tour. The band invited Hurley to fill-in once more, while Stump borrowed one of Trohman's guitars for the trek. While most shows were cancelled, the band played any show possible: "Let's just get on whatever show we can. You can pay us in pizza", remembered Wentz. As the tour concluded, the general consensus was that Hurley would be the band's new drummer, and the band began to shop around the three songs from the group's unreleased split as a demo to record labels. The band members set their sights on pop-punk labels and attempted, with considerable effort, to join Drive-Thru Records. A showcase for label co-founders went largely mediocre, and the band were offered to sign to side label Rushmore, which they declined. They got particularly far in discussions with The Militia Group and Victory Records, and Bob McLynn of Crush Management became the band's first manager. The band re-entered the studio with O'Keefe to record several more tracks to create label interest. Wentz felt "in the backseat" in writing the songs and temporarily questioned his place in the group, but Stump argued in his favor: "No! That's not fair! Don't leave me with this band! Don't make me kind of like this band and then leave it! That's bullshit!"

The band's early tour vehicle was a "tiny V6 that was running on three cylinders, and it was not getting enough air, so it would drive really slowly", recalled Wentz. "We had to turn on the hot air to reach the speed limit, so we had the heat on all the time in 120-degree weather. It was so hot it melted the plastic molding around the windows. When it rained, we'd get all wet." John Janick of Fueled by Ramen had heard an early version of a Fall Out Boy song online and cold-called the band members at their apartment, first reaching Stump and later talking to Wentz for an hour. Rob Stevenson from Island Records eventually offered the band a "first-ever incubator sort of deal", in which they gave the band money to sign with Fueled by Ramen for the group's one-off debut, knowing they could "upstream" the band to radio on the sophomore record. Fueled by Ramen, at the time the smallest of independent labels clamoring to sign the band, would effectively release the group's debut album and help build the band's expanding fanbase before the group moved to Island. The band again partnered with O'Keefe at Smart Studios, bringing together the three songs from the demo and recording an additional seven songs in nine days. The band, according to Stump, didn't "sleep anywhere that we could shower [...] There was a girl that Andy's girlfriend at the time went to school with who let us sleep on her floor, but we'd be there for maybe four hours at a time. It was crazy." As the band progressed and the members' roles became more defined, Wentz took lyrics extremely seriously in contrast to Stump, who had been the group's primary lyricist up to that point. Arguments during the recording sessions led to what "most reductively boils down to Wentz writing the lyrics and Stump writing the melodies".

The band's debut album, Take This to Your Grave, was released on May 6, 2003. Evening Out with Your Girlfriend was released shortly before Grave in March 2003, when the band had gained considerable momentum. "Our record was something being rushed out to help generate some interest, but that interest was building before we could even get the record out", said Uprising Records owner Sean Muttaqi. The band actively tried to stop Uprising from releasing the recordings (as the band's relationship with Muttaqi had grown sour), as the band viewed it as a "giant piece of garbage" recorded before Hurley's involvement, which the band members no longer considered their debut album. Gradually, the band's fanbase grew in size as the label pushed for the album's mainstream success. According to Wentz, shows began to end in a near-riot and the group were banned from several venues because the entire crowd would end up onstage. The band gained positive reviews for subsequent gigs at South by Southwest (SXSW) and various tour appearances. The band joined the Warped Tour for five dates in the summer of 2004, and on one date the band had only performed three songs when the stage collapsed due to the large crowd. The band appeared on the cover of the August 2004 edition of Alternative Press, and listening stations at Hot Topic partially helped the album move 2,000-3,000 copies per week by Christmas 2004, at which point the label considered the band "tipping" into mainstream success.

=== 2005–2006: From Under the Cork Tree ===
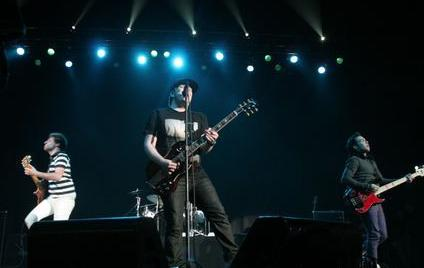
Fall Out Boy performing in 2006

The band had been flooded with "hyperbolic praise", and deemed "the next big thing" by multiple media outlets. Before recording the follow-up to its debut, the band released the acoustic EP/DVD My Heart Will Always Be the B-Side to My Tongue. The EP was the band's first charting on the Billboard 200 at number 153. From Under the Cork Tree was recorded in Burbank, California, and served as the first time the band had stayed in California for an extended period of time. The group lived in corporate housing during the making of the album. In contrast to Take This to Your Grave's rushed recording schedule, Fall Out Boy took a much more gradual pace while working on From Under the Cork Tree. It was the first Fall Out Boy record in which Stump created all the music and Wentz wrote all the lyrics, continuing the approach they took for some songs on Grave. Stump felt that this process was much more "smooth" as every member was able to focus on his individual strengths. He explained: "We haven't had any of those moments when I play the music and he'll say, 'I don't like that,' and he'll read me lyrics and I'll say, 'I don't like those lyrics.' It's very natural and fun." Despite this, the band had great difficulty creating its desired sound for the album, constantly scrapping new material. Two weeks before recording sessions began, the group abandoned ten songs and wrote eight more, including the album's first single, "Sugar, We're Goin Down".

The band suffered a setback, however, when Wentz had an emotional breakdown in February 2005, culminating in a suicide attempt. He had withdrawn from the rest of the group, with his condition only apparent through his lyrics, and had also become obsessed with the recent Indian tsunami and his own self-doubt. "It is particularly overwhelming when you are on the cusp of doing something very big and thinking that it will be a big flop", he said later. Wentz swallowed a handful of Ativan anxiety pills (he described the act as "hypermedicating") in the Chicago Best Buy parking lot. After being rushed to the hospital and having his stomach pumped, Wentz moved back home to Wilmette to live with his parents.

From Under the Cork Tree debuted and peaked at number nine on the Billboard 200 upon its May 3, 2005 release. It was spearheaded by the band's breakthrough single, "Sugar, We're Goin' Down", reached number eight in the US Billboard Hot 100 in September 2005, and in the UK chart in February 2006, crossing over from Alternative to Pop radio. "Dance, Dance", the album's second single, also was a top ten hit in the United States and was certified 3× Platinum in 2014. The record's success led to stardom among teenagers in North America, and the band's first arena tour had the group playing to 10,000 people per night. Rolling Stone wrote that the band's "anthems", distributed and marketed through their MySpace, connected with "skinny-jeans-wearing teen girls". In support of From Under the Cork Tree, the band toured exhaustively with international tours, TRL visits, late-night television appearances and music award shows. The band performed at music festivals in 2005 and 2006, including the third Nintendo Fusion Tour in the fall of 2005, joining The Starting Line, Motion City Soundtrack, Boys Night Out, and Panic! at the Disco on a 31 city tour. The album earned the band a Grammy nomination for Best New Artist, and has sold over 2.7 million copies in the United States, becoming the group's best-selling album. "Sugar, We're Goin Down" also won the band an MTV Video Music Award.

=== 2007: Infinity on High ===
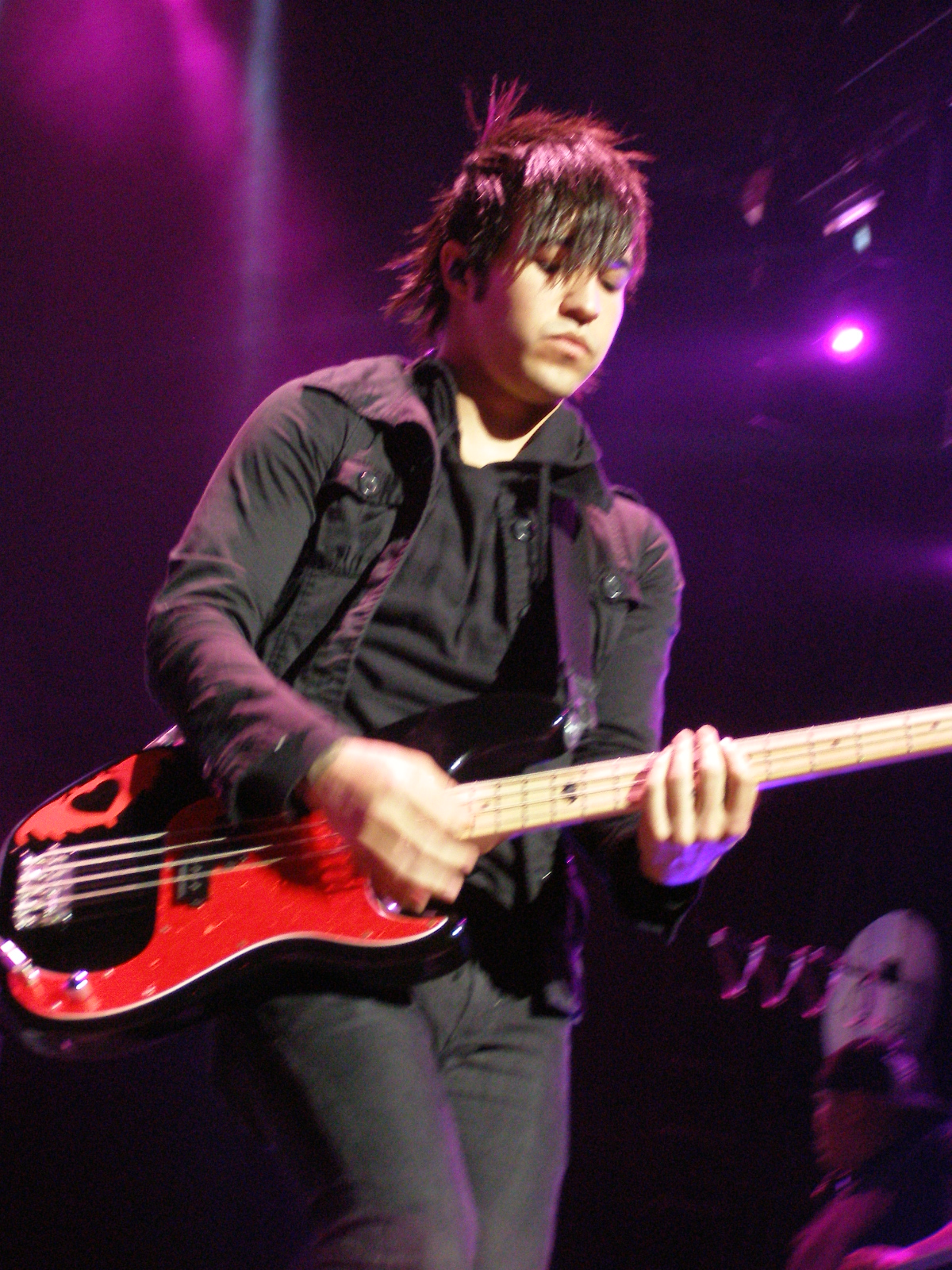
Pete Wentz in 2007

In the wake of the band's multiplatinum success, the "especially extroverted" Wentz became the most publicly visible member of the band. He confided to the press about his suicide attempt and his nude photos appeared on the Internet in 2006. He gained additional exposure through his clothing line, his Decaydance record label (an imprint of Fueled by Ramen), and eventually a celebrity relationship with pop singer Ashlee Simpson, which made the two tabloid fixtures in the United States. Due to its increased success from the group's MTV Video Music Award, Fall Out Boy headlined the Black Clouds and Underdogs Tour, a pop-punk event that featured The All-American Rejects, Hawthorne Heights, and From First to Last. The tour also featured The Hush Sound for half of the tour and October Fall for half. The band played to 53 dates in the U.S., Canada, and the UK.

After taking a two-month-long break following the band's Black Clouds and Underdogs tour in promotion of From Under the Cork Tree, Fall Out Boy returned to the studio to begin work on a follow-up effort. The band began writing songs for the new album while touring, and intended to quickly make a new album in order to keep momentum in the wake of its breakthrough success. On February 6, 2007, the band released its third studio album, Infinity on High, the band's second release on major label Island. The album implements a diverse array of musical styles, including funk, R&B, and flamenco. As reported by Billboard, Fall Out Boy "drifts further from its hardcore punk roots to write increasingly accessible pop tunes."

Infinity's first week was a major success and was the band's biggest selling week, selling 260,000 copies to debut at No. 1 on the US Billboard 200 and inside the top five worldwide. This charting was first started with lead single "The Carpal Tunnel of Love", with minor success on the Billboard charts. This success was bolstered by the further-successful second single "This Ain't a Scene, It's an Arms Race", which reached No. 2 in both the US and UK as well as the top five in many other countries. On the band's decision to pick the song as a single, Wentz commented "There may be other songs on the record that would be bigger radio hits, but this one had the right message." "Thnks fr th Mmrs", the third single, peaked at No. 12, and went on to sell over two million copies in the US. It found its greatest success in Australia, where it charted at No. 3. In 2007, Fall Out Boy placed at No. 9 in the Top Selling Digital Artists chart with 4,423,000 digital tracks sold, according to Nielsen SoundScan. The album itself has sold over two million copies worldwide and subsequently was certified Platinum in the United States.

Fall Out Boy then headlined the 2007 Honda Civic Tour to promote the album. Though the tour was initially postponed due to "personal issues," it would take place with +44, Cobra Starship, The Academy Is... and Paul Wall as supporting acts. The band also headlined the Young Wild Things Tour, an international arena tour featuring Gym Class Heroes, Plain White T's and Cute Is What We Aim For. Inspired by Maurice Sendak's 1963 children's book Where the Wild Things Are, the concert tour and included sets designed by artist Rob Dobi containing images from the book. The band's "hugely successful" amphitheater tour to promote Infinity led to the release of the 2008 live album Live in Phoenix, consisting of live material recorded during a June 22, 2007, concert at Phoenix's Cricket Wireless Pavilion, a date of the Honda Civic Tour. The disc also included a studio cover of Michael Jackson's "Beat It", with guitarist John Mayer guesting for a guitar solo. The track was released as a single and became a mainstay on the iTunes top ten.

=== 2008–2009: Folie à Deux ===
The band members decided to keep publicity down during the recording of their fourth album, as the group was taken aback by press surrounding Infinity on High. Sessions proved to be difficult for the band; Stump called the making of the album "painful", noting that he and Wentz quarreled over many issues, revealing "I threw something across the room over a major-to-minor progression." On previous albums, Trohman felt he and Hurley did not have enough musical freedom and that Stump and Wentz exerted too much control over the group: "I felt, 'Man, this isn't my band anymore.' It's no one's fault, and I don't want to make it seem that way. It was more of a complex I developed based on stuff I was reading. It's hard to hear, 'Joe and Andy are just along for the ride.'" To amend the situation, Trohman sat down with Stump to communicate his concerns, which led to more collaboration on Folie à Deux. "It made me feel like I owned the songs a lot more. It made me really excited about contributing to Fall Out Boy and made me find my role in the band," Trohman recalled.

As the release of the new album approached, the band and its management found that they would have to navigate changes in the music industry, facing declining record sales, the lack of a proper outlet for exhibition of music videos, and the burgeoning US economic crisis. To promote the album, Wentz launched a viral campaign in August 2008, inspired by George Orwell's novel Nineteen Eighty-Four (1949), and the autocratic, overbearing Big Brother organization. Folie à Deux, released in December 2008, did not perform as well commercially as its predecessor, Infinity on High. It debuted at number eight on the US Billboard 200 chart with first week sales of 150,000 copies during a highly competitive week with other big debuts, becoming Fall Out Boy's third consecutive top ten album. This is in contrast to the band's more successful previous effort, which shifted 260,000 copies in its opening week to debut at number one on the chart. Folie spent two weeks within the top 20 out of its 22 chart weeks. It also entered Billboard's Rock Albums and Alternative Albums charts at number three. Within two months of its release, Folie à Deux was certified Gold in the United States by the Recording Industry Association of America (RIAA), denoting shipments of 500,000 copies. The lead single, "I Don't Care", reached a peak at number twenty-one on the Billboard Hot 100, and was certified two-times Platinum by the RIAA for shipments of two million copies.

To promote the album, Fall Out Boy embarked on the Believers Never Die Tour Part Deux, which included dates in the United States and Canada. The constant touring schedule became difficult for the band due to conflicting fan opinion regarding Folie à Deux: concertgoers would "boo the band for performing numbers from the record in concert", leading Stump to describe touring in support of Folie as like "being the last act at the vaudeville show: We were rotten vegetable targets in Clandestine hoods." "Some of us were miserable onstage", said guitarist Joe Trohman. "Others were just drunk." A greatest hits compilation, Believers Never Die – Greatest Hits was released on November 17, 2009. Following these events, the band decided to take a break. The band's decision stemmed from disillusionment with the music industry. Stump recalled that "We found ourselves running on fumes a little bit – creatively and probably as people, too." Stump realized the band was desperate to take a break; he sat the group down and explained that a hiatus was in order if the band wanted to continue in the future. All involved felt the dynamic of the group had changed as personalities developed.

Rumors and misquotes led to confusion as to what such a break truly meant. Wentz preferred to not refer to the break as a "hiatus", instead explaining that the band was just "decompressing". Fall Out Boy played its last show at Madison Square Garden on October 4, 2009. Near the end, Blink-182's Mark Hoppus shaved Wentz's head in a move Andy Greene in Rolling Stone later described as a "symbolic cleansing of the past, but also the beginning of a very dark chapter for the band".

=== 2010–2012: Hiatus and side projects ===
By the time the break began, Stump was the heaviest he had ever been and loathed the band's image as an "emo" band. Coming home from tour, drummer Andy Hurley "went through the darkest depression [I've] ever felt. I looked at my calendar and it was just empty." Wentz, who had been abusing Xanax and Klonopin, was divorced by his wife Ashlee Simpson and returned to therapy. "I'd basically gone from being the guy in Fall Out Boy to being the guy who, like, hangs out all day", Wentz recalled. Previously known as the "overexposed, despised" leader of the band, Wentz "simply grew up", sharing custody of his son and embracing maturity: "There was a jump-cut in my life. I started thinking – like, being old would be cool."

During the hiatus, the band members each pursued individual musical interests, which were met with "varying degrees of failure". Stump was the only member of the quartet to take on a solo project while Fall Out Boy was on hiatus, recording debut album Soul Punk entirely on his own: he wrote, produced, and played every instrument for all tracks on the record. In addition, he married his longtime girlfriend and lost over sixty pounds through portion control and exercise. Stump blew through most of his savings putting together a large band to tour behind Soul Punk, but ticket sales were sparse and the album stalled commercially. During a particularly dark moment in February 2012, Stump poured his heart out in a 1500-word blog entry called "We Liked You Better Fat: Confessions of a Pariah". In the post, Stump lamented the harsh reception of the record and his status as a "has-been" at 27. Stump revealed that fans harassed him on his solo tour, hurling insults such as "We liked you better fat", and noted that "Whatever notoriety Fall Out Boy used to have prevents me from having the ability to start over from the bottom again." Aside from Soul Punk and personal developments, Stump moonlighted as a professional songwriter/producer, co-writing tracks with Bruno Mars and All Time Low, and pursued acting.

Wentz formed electronic duo Black Cards with vocalist Bebe Rexha in July 2010. The project released one single before album delays led to Rexha's departure in 2011. Black Cards added Spencer Peterson to complete the Use Your Disillusion EP in 2012. Wentz also completed writing a novel, Gray, that he had been working on for six years outside the band, and began hosting the reality tattoo competition show Best Ink. Hurley ventured farther into rock during the hiatus, drumming with multiple bands over the three-year period. He continued to manage his record label, Fuck City, and drummed for bands Burning Empires and Enabler. He also formed heavy metal outfit The Damned Things with Trohman, Scott Ian and Rob Caggiano of Anthrax, and Keith Buckley of Every Time I Die. Despite this, the members all remained cordial to one another; Wentz was Stump's best man at his wedding. The hiatus was, all things considered, beneficial for the group and its members, according to Hurley. "The hiatus helped them all kind of figure themselves out", he explained in 2013. "Especially Joe and Patrick, who were so young. And Pete is a million times better."

=== 2013–2014: Reformation and Save Rock and Roll ===
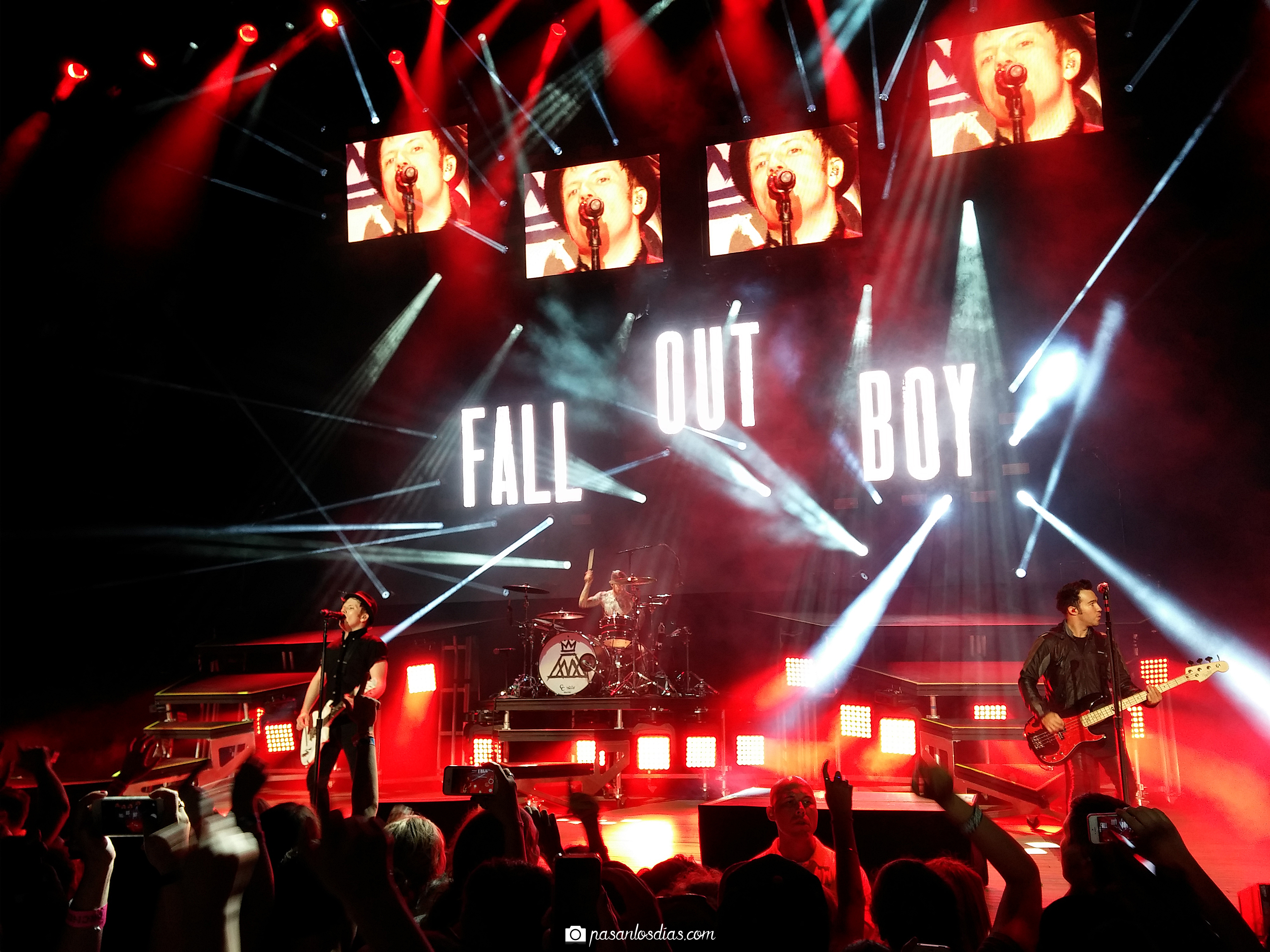
Fall Out Boy performing during their Monumentour, which also featured Paramore, in 2014

Stump and Wentz met up for the first time in several years in early 2012 for a writing session. Wentz reached out to Stump after he penned his letter, as he too felt he was in a dark place and needed a creative outlet. He was at first reluctant to approach Stump, likening the phone call to reconnecting with a lover after years of acrimony. "I know what you need – you need your band", Wentz told Stump. "I think it's kind of weird that we haven't really seen each other this year. We paid for each other's houses and you don't know my kid", Wentz remarked. The result, "three or four" new songs, were shelved with near immediacy, with the two concluding that "it just wasn't right and didn't feel right." Several months later, the two reconvened and wrote tracks that they felt truly represented the band in a modern form. The band decided that if a comeback was in order, it must represent the band in its current form: "We didn't want to come back just to bask in the glory days and, like, and collect a few checks and pretend ... and do our best 2003 impersonation", said Stump. Afterwards, the quartet held an all-day secret meeting at their manager's home in New York City where they discussed ideas and the mechanics of getting together to record. Trohman was the last to be contacted, through a three-hour phone call from Stump. While Trohman was arguably the most excited to begin other projects, he had stipulations for rejoining the band. "If I'm not coming back to this band writing music […] then I don't want to", he remarked. Stump supported Trohman's ambition, saying Trohman "needed to be writing more".

The band members' main goal was to reinvent the group's sound from scratch, creating what Trohman called a "reimagining of the band", which focuses more on pop. Sessions were not without difficulties, as the band struggled initially to produce new material. Walker had doubts about the band's volatility, feeling the record would not get made following "meltdown after meltdown". The entire album was recorded in secrecy from the music industry, critics, and fans of the band. While specifically denying that the group's announcement was a reunion because "[the group had] never broke[n] up", the band announced a reunion tour and details of Save Rock and Roll on February 4, 2013. The quartet's announcement included a photo of the group that had been taken earlier that morning of the band members huddled around a bonfire, tossing copies of their back catalog into flames at Comiskey Park, the original location of 1979's Disco Demolition Night, a baseball promotional event which involved destroying disco records. A message on the group's website read "when we were kids the only thing that got us through most days was music. It's why we started Fall Out Boy in the first place. This isn't a reunion because we never broke up. We needed to plug back in and make some music that matters to us. The future of Fall Out Boy starts now. Save rock and roll..." Save Rock and Roll debuted at number one on the Billboard 200 chart, with first week sales of 154,000 copies in the United States, according to Nielsen SoundScan. The arrival of Save Rock and Roll posted the quartet's third-biggest sales week, and earned the group's second career number one on the chart. The band's chart success was described as unexpected by music journalists. Andy Greene in Rolling Stone called the band's comeback a "rather stunning renaissance", and Entertainment Weekly called the number one a "major accomplishment for a band whom many in the industry had dismissed as kings of a genre whose time had passed".

The record's lead single, "My Songs Know What You Did in the Dark (Light Em Up)", was released on February 4, 2013, and peaked at number 13 on the Billboard Hot 100, marking the band's first top twenty single since the group's 2008 cover of Michael Jackson's "Beat It". It was certified 8× Platinum in the US for over 8 million sales. Inspired in part by Daft Punk's Interstella 5555: The 5tory of the 5ecret 5tar 5ystem, the band released a music video for every song on the album in a series titled The Young Blood Chronicles between February 2013 and May 2014.

Fall Out Boy released a hardcore punk-influenced EP, PAX AM Days, on October 15, 2013. On September 30, the first digital single "Love, Sex, Death" premiered with its accompanying video. The EP marked a return to Fall Out Boy's hardcore musical roots, the "antithesis" to the polished Save Rock and Roll. PAX AM Days was recorded across two days in July 2013 with producer Ryan Adams. Fall Out Boy covered Elton John's (who was featured on the Save Rock And Roll title track) song "Saturday Night's Alright for Fighting" for inclusion in the fortieth anniversary re-release edition of Goodbye Yellow Brick Road on March 25, 2014, alongside covers by different artists.

Fall Out Boy headlined Save Rock And Roll tours (including US, Australian and European legs) and played at music festivals around the world for one and a half years. The group co-headlined Monumentour with Paramore in North America to close the Save Rock And Roll era.

=== 2014–2016: American Beauty/American Psycho ===
On June 2, 2014, Wentz stated that he and Stump were writing new music: "We're writing. I was just listening to something Patrick had written in the trailer. So we're writing, finishing out the album cycle in South Africa in September." In a later interview with Rock Sound regarding the status of the album, Wentz commented "We don't have an exact timetable yet. I have a two-week-old son and Patrick has a baby on the way in October, so there's a lot going on," and stated a rough release time as early 2015. In December 2014, the band played radio-sponsored Christmas shows, including KROQ's Almost Acoustic Christmas.

"Centuries" – the first single of Fall Out Boy's sixth studio album – premiered on September 8, 2014, on BBC Radio 1, receiving a worldwide release the next day. By the 2010s, there were few rock bands achieving success on mainstream radio and the charts, but "Centuries" peaked at No. 10 on the Billboard Hot 100 and No. 13 on Billboard Mainstream Top 40. Fall Out Boy also was featured on the track "Back to Earth" from Steve Aoki's second album Neon Future I, which was released on September 30, 2014. Another song titled "Immortals" was released October 14, 2014, as part of the soundtrack for the Walt Disney film Big Hero 6. The group remade the Chicago Bulls's anthem "Only the Bulls" with guest Lupe Fiasco. The recording of the song was released in November 2014.

On November 24, 2014, the title of Fall Out Boy's sixth studio album was announced as American Beauty/American Psycho; the album was released on January 20, 2015. The album's title track premiered on BBC Radio 1 in the UK along with the album's title reveal. American Beauty/American Psycho debuted at No. 1 on the US Billboard 200 with 192,000 first week sales and 218,000 equivalent album units, becoming Fall Out Boy's third No. 1 album. The band played two small venue release shows in January 2015, in London and Chicago. American Beauty/American Psycho was certified platinum in the US on March 1, 2016, after selling 1 million units. From February through March, the band played at the Australian Soundwave festival for the first time, with two additional side shows in Sydney and Brisbane.

Fall Out Boy inducted Green Day into the Rock and Roll Hall of Fame on April 18, 2015. On May 18, the group performed their song "Uma Thurman" with Wiz Khalifa on the 2015 Billboard Music Awards. In June–August 2015, Fall Out Boy toured across the United States with Wiz Khalifa, Hoodie Allen, and MAX on the "Boys of Zummer Tour".

On October 1, 2015, the American Beauty/American Psycho European tour kicked off in Dublin, Ireland, and consisted of 12 dates with shows in the UK, Russia, and Europe. On May 24, 2015, it was announced English rapper Professor Green would support Fall Out Boy on the 8-date leg of the band's UK tour. New York based dance-duo Matt and Kim were added as additional support for the UK tour. On October 23, 2015, Fall Out Boy announced the release of a re-worked version of its sixth studio album called, Make America Psycho Again. The remix album features a remade version of each track from the original record, each featuring a different rapper. The album was released on October 30, 2015. It included the version of "Uma Thurman" featuring Wiz Khalifa which had been originally performed at the Billboard Music Awards. On March 1, 2016, it was announced Fall Out Boy were to headline Reading and Leeds Festivals in the UK in August 2016 along with Biffy Clyro.

=== 2017–2022: Mania and Hella Mega Tour ===
On April 27, 2017, Fall Out Boy announced that their new album was set to be released on September 15, titled Mania. The first single, "Young and Menace", was released the same day. The second single, "Champion", was released in the U.S. on June 22, 2017. Music videos were posted to Vevo and YouTube for both songs. The band launched the Mania Tour in North America in October 2017 with hip hop artist Blackbear and actor-rapper Jaden Smith, and performed in Australia in 2018 with indie band WAAX. On August 3, 2017, it was announced that the album's release would be pushed back to January 19, 2018, because the band were not satisfied with the results of their work at the time. The proceeds from the Houston leg of the Mania Tour was donated to Hurricane Harvey relief efforts.

"The Last of the Real Ones", released on September 14, 2017, in North America and worldwide the following day, was the third single from Mania to be released, and was played on Jimmy Kimmel Live! on September 18, 2017, after being debuted at House of Blues in Chicago on September 16. The band announced the album's completion on November 6, 2017, along with the final track list. "Hold Me Tight or Don't" was then released as the fourth single on November 15, with the music video being released alongside. Mania was officially released January 19, 2018 and debuted at number one on the Billboard 200, making it the band's third consecutive and fourth chart-topping debut overall.

On February 23, 2018, the band released an EP called Llamania. The EP contains three unfinished demo recordings. On August 23, 2018, the band released an EP called Lake Effect Kid. The EP includes a new version of a demo, with the same name, from the band's 2008 mixtape, CitizensFOB Mixtape: Welcome to the New Administration. In September 2018, Fall Out Boy headlined Wrigley Field in the band's hometown of Chicago, marking a milestone in their career as their first headline show at a stadium. On December 7, 2018, Fall Out Boy received their second Grammy nomination for Best Rock Album for Mania.

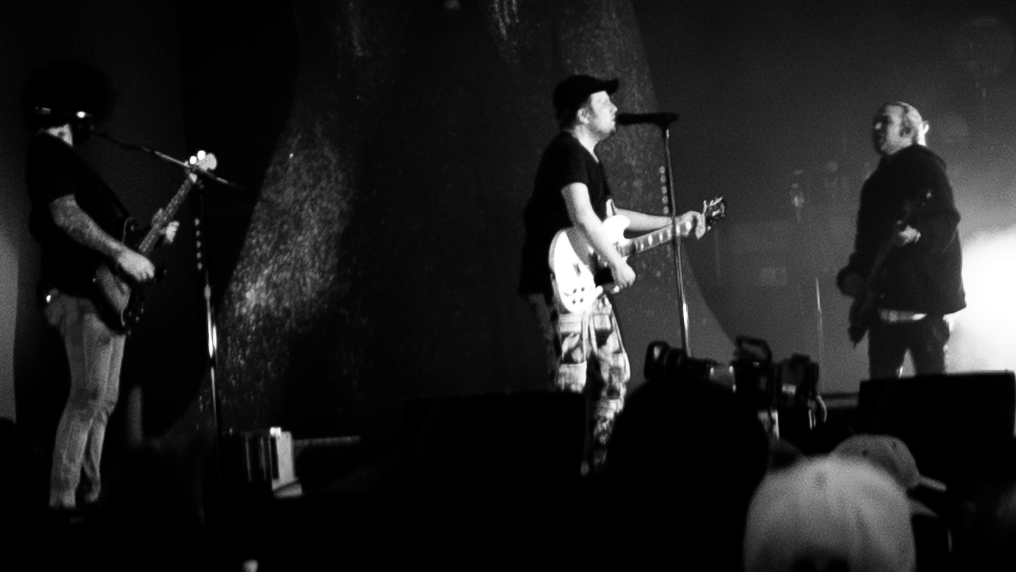
Fall Out Boy performing at Comerica Park in 2021 during the Hella Mega Tour.

In 2019, the band was sued by Furry Puppet Studio for overusing llama puppets made by the company. According to the company, the llamas were only licensed for use in the "Young and Menace" video but were used at live shows, on merchandise, during TV appearances, and in multiple music videos. On September 10, 2019, the band announced the Hella Mega Tour with Green Day and Weezer as headliners along themselves, with The Interrupters as an opening act. They also released "Dear Future Self (Hands Up)" off their second compilation album, Greatest Hits: Believers Never Die – Volume Two, released in November 2019. Due to the COVID-19 pandemic, the summer leg of the tour was rescheduled to 2021. On August 4, 2021, during the Hella Mega Tour, the band announced that they would not be performing at New York's Citi Field, Boston's Fenway Park due to one of the band's team members testing positive for COVID-19. They later announced they would drop out of an August 8 date at Washington D.C.'s Nationals Park. However, Green Day and Weezer performed as scheduled.

=== 2023–present: So Much (for) Stardust ===
On January 11, 2023, the band announced the single, "Love from the Other Side". The song was released on January 18 as the lead single for the album So Much (for) Stardust, which was released on March 24. Following the conclusion of their album deal with Island Records, the band signed with Fueled by Ramen and Elektra Records for the album's release, marking their first release under Fueled by Ramen since Take This to Your Grave. It was also announced that the album was produced by Neal Avron, making it the first time Fall Out Boy had worked with him since Folie à Deux. The same day, guitarist Joe Trohman announced publicly on social media that he would be taking a break from the band to focus on his mental health, but stated that he intended to return. The band played "Love from the Other Side" on Jimmy Kimmel Live! the same day that the song was released. The band performed as a trio, without Trohman, marking the first time they have ever done so publicly. On January 19, 2023, the band posted a photo of another package containing another seashell marked 2 of 13 with the date January 25, 2023, and a speculated song title: "Heartbreak Feels So Good". The band later confirmed "Heartbreak Feels So Good" and its release date, with promotion featuring actress Nicole Kidman.

On January 31, 2023, the band announced the So Much For (Tour) Dust tour in support of their eighth album, which began on June 21, 2023, at Wrigley Field in Chicago and concluded on April 6, 2024, at Target Center in Minneapolis. The tour featured bands such as Bring Me the Horizon, The Academy Is..., Alkaline Trio. On March 24, the same day the album was released, the band released a music video for "Hold Me Like a Grudge". The video is a continuation of the music video for the band's song, "This Ain't a Scene, It's an Arms Race". On May 29, 2023, Trohman confirmed in an Instagram post that he had returned to the band. On June 5, 2023, it was announced that the band would be featured on Taylor Swift's re-recorded album, Speak Now (Taylor's Version), on the song "Electric Touch". On June 28, 2023, the band released an updated version of Billy Joel's 1989 single "We Didn't Start the Fire", featuring lyrics updated to include events from 1989 to 2023.

On December 15, 2023, the band released the demo song, "Pavlove", for the fifteenth anniversary of their fourth album, Folie à Deux. On February 28, 2024, the band released a music video for the album's fourth single, title track "So Much (For) Stardust", featuring NBA player Jimmy Butler. On July 7 2025, Joe Trohman announced that he would not be touring with Fall Out Boy for the rest of 2025. In his announcement, he stated that he will be needing surgery on his right hand, and that he would return to touring once it is healed. In August 2025, the band announced a deluxe edition of their second album From Under The Cork Tree for the album's 20th anniversary, with a release date of October 17.

On November 9, 2026, the band released the single, "Aces". The band also announced the Twilight of the Punks tour with A Day to Remember, Neck Deep, the Offspring, Good Charlotte, and the Story So Far. On November 13, the band released the single, "Doomsday Generation (Slacker for the Ages)", featuring Walter Schreifels.

== Musical style and influences ==
"Sugar, We're Goin Down"
The Phoenix New Times writer Martin Cizmar wrote that "Sugar, We're Goin Down" was possibly "the most listened-to emo track of all time".

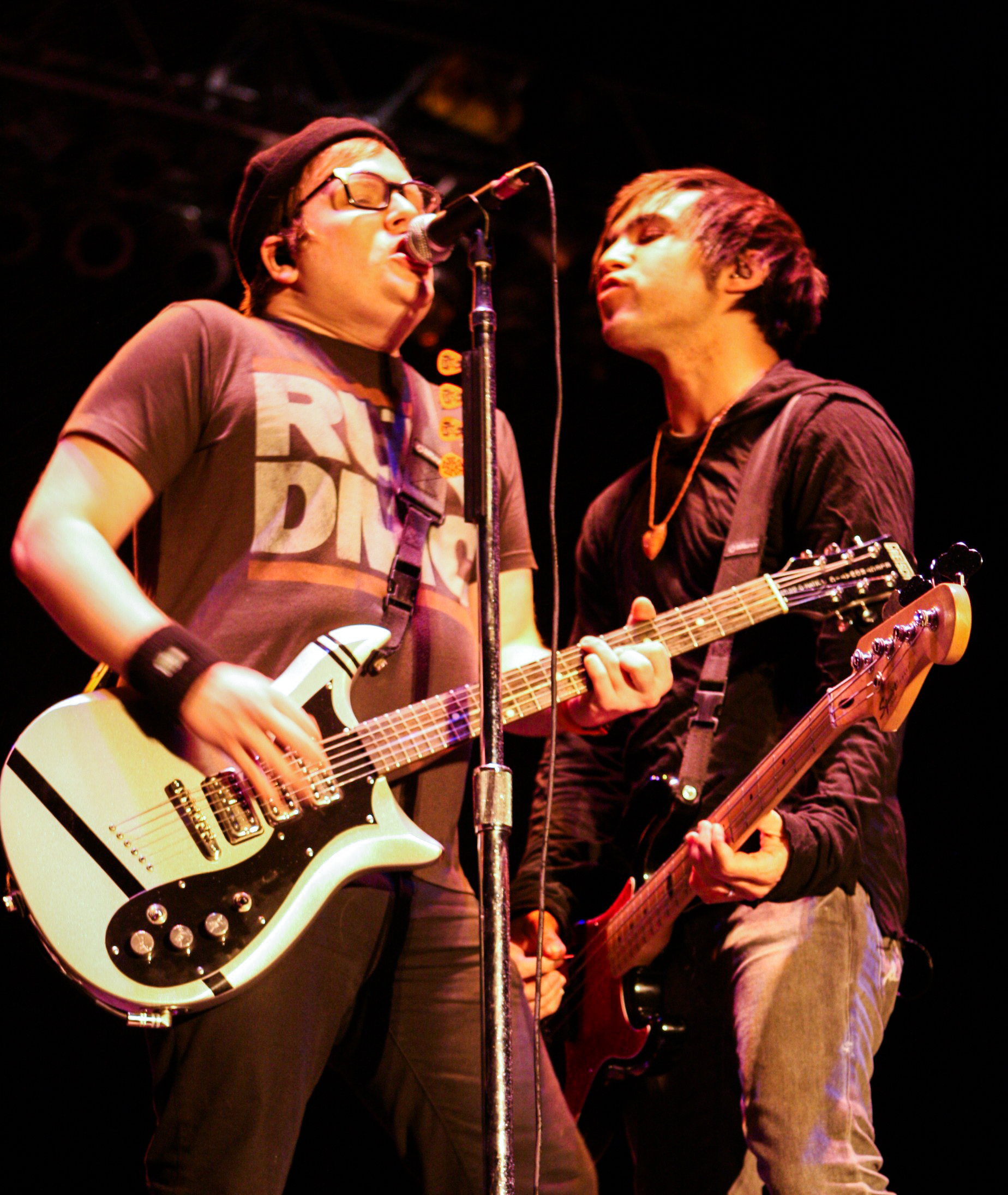
Patrick Stump (left) and Pete Wentz (right)

Fall Out Boy's music has been primarily described as pop-punk, pop rock, emo, pop, alternative rock, emo pop, and punk rock, (Note: Musical styles: "pop-punk"; "pop rock"; "emo"; "pop"; "alternative rock"; "emo pop"; "punk rock") with elements of electronic, R&B, soul, funk, orchestral, disco, blue-eyed soul, electropop, power pop, new wave, and hardcore punk. The members of the band were in hardcore, metalcore, and grindcore bands, and Pete Wentz self-describes the band's sound as "softcore" due to their incorporation of hardcore elements. Fall Out Boy's influences include Green Day, The Damned, Sex Pistols, Metallica, The Kinks, The Rolling Stones, and Weezer.

Wentz in particular has expressed a fondness for The Get Up Kids stating in 2005 that "Fall Out Boy would not be a band if it were not for The Get Up Kids." Early in the band's career, when Jared Logan was producing the group's debut album, he asked bassist Pete Wentz what sound the band desired for recording. Wentz responded by "handing over the first two New Found Glory records". Wentz also cites Misfits, the Ramones, Screeching Weasel, Earth Crisis, Gorilla Biscuits, and Lifetime as inspirations. The band acknowledges its hardcore punk roots as an influence; all four members were involved in the Chicago hardcore scene before joining Fall Out Boy. Wentz described the band's affiliation with the genre by saying "I think the interesting thing is that we are all hardcore kids that are writing pop music...It gives us a different style because at our core we are always hardcore. That aspect is always going to be evident in the music. We are hardcore kids that couldn't quite cut it as hardcore kids." He referred to Fall Out Boy's genre as "softcore": hardcore punk mixed with pop sensibility. Lead singer Patrick Stump, however, is also influenced by a wide variety of bands and artists, including Elvis Costello, Pantera guitarist Dimebag Darrell, Prince, Michael Jackson, and David Bowie.

Fall Out Boy's early material has been characterized as "blending power pop-style hooks with soulful vocals and dance-friendly grooves." The albums Take This to Your Grave and From Under the Cork Tree are both said to have pop-punk as well as punk rock sounds and influences, and Infinity on High features a wide range of styles and instrumentation, including orchestral arrangements ("Thnks fr th Mmrs") and a slower piano ballad ("Golden"). R&B influences on Infinity on High are on songs such as "This Ain't a Scene, It's an Arms Race" and two of the album's tracks are produced by R&B singer/producer Babyface. On Folie à Deux, the group continues to evolve its sound, with less of a pop-punk sound and increasing the use of piano (such as "What a Catch, Donnie", "Headfirst Slide into Cooperstown on a Bad Bet", and "20 Dollar Nose Bleed"), synthesizers, and guest artists. The band also shows a number of influences, with "Disloyal Order of Water Buffaloes" borrowing a chord sequence from The Who song "Baba O'Riley". The group has worked with many producers and artists, including The Neptunes, Timbaland, Ryan Adams, Lil Wayne, and Kanye West, the latter of which Patrick Stump described as "the Prince of his generation".

When the band returned from hiatus with Save Rock and Roll, their main goal was to reinvent the sound of the group from scratch, creating what Trohman called a "reimagining of the band", which focused more on pop and moved away from the punk aspects of their sound. The album mixes pop, rock and R&B, and Dave Simpson of The Guardian noted influences from Heart in the album's ballads. In American Beauty/American Psycho, the band felt influences from playing with different artists and expanded on boundaries further than Save Rock and Roll did. In an interview with Rolling Stone, guitarist Joe Trohman said the album has "hip hop grooves with guitars on it", with "more in your face guitar than Save Rock and Roll". Annie Zaleski of Alternative Press described American Beauty/American Psycho as a "mix of fluid grooves, punky riffs and outré pop sensibilities". Their seventh album, Mania, continued their departure from pop-punk and has been described as pop rock, electronic rock, and electropop. Their eighth album, So Much (for) Stardust, marked a return to guitar-driven material. Sarah Jamieson of DIY, wrote that, "[the album] sounds closer to...their 2008 record Folie à Deux than 2018's...Mania, there's a return to the bold, luscious pop-rock that they honed early on." Alternative Press called it "a...classic work of pop-punk gold with smart lyrics, stirring instrumentals, and the head-banging rock". Mark Beaumont of The Independent stated that "[the album contains] grandiose orchestral passages, spoken word interludes...dotted among the roaring angst rock...[that blends] of their various eras...[and] pulls the plug on the rise of the machines." The album also has elements of disco, soul and funk.

A central part of Fall Out Boy's sound is rooted in the band's lyrics, mainly penned by bassist Pete Wentz, who commonly uses irony and other literary devices to narrate personal experience and stories. Wentz stated, "I write about what I'm going through most of the time, or what I imagine people are going through most of the time." He draws inspiration from authors such as Charles Bukowski, Ernest Hemingway, and JT LeRoy, as well as rappers such as Lil Wayne, who he described as his primary influence while writing Infinity on High. On Fall Out Boy's earlier works, Wentz wrote primarily about love and heartbreak. Themes addressed on From Under the Cork Tree include narcissism and megalomania, while many tracks on Infinity on High discuss the ups and downs of fame. While writing Folie à Deux, he explored moral dilemmas and societal shortcomings, as well as concepts such as trust, infidelity, responsibility, and commitment. While the album does contain political overtones, the band wanted to avoid being overt about these themes, leaving many lyrics open to interpretation for listeners.

== Legacy ==
Fall Out Boy have been instrumental in the careers of other artists, such as Panic! at the Disco, whom Pete Wentz signed to his record label, Decaydance Records, in late 2004. Several artists, such as You Me at Six and Taylor Swift, have created or performed covers of Fall Out Boy songs in homage to the band.

The Fall Out Boy band members were the first inductees to the "Hall of Wood" at the 2015 MtvU Woodie Awards and performed a medley of five songs at the ceremony. This honor is given to artists who have used MTV Woodie Awards as a "launching pad" in achieving chart topping success within their musical careers, thus influencing up and coming bands. The award also recognizes bands "sticking to their roots" and "maintaining their loyal fan base". The group had won the Woodie Award for Streaming for "Grand Theft Autumn" at the first ceremony in 2004.

In a list of the 50 greatest pop-punk albums of all time, Rolling Stone placed Fall Out Boy's 2003 album Take This To Your Grave as the fifth greatest, citing it as "[ushering] in a whole new, genre-blurring scene, in which heavy riffs and a screamo aesthetic mingled with old-fashioned teen heartbreak". In a similar list, Kerrang! magazine placed Take This To Your Grave at number 11 out of 51, describing it as a "blueprint for both break-up records and timeless pop-punk". More negatively, in 2013 the staff of OC Weekly ranked Fall Out Boy ninth on its list of the "Top 10 Worst Emo Bands Of All Time". They said: "Basically it kills me to put this band up here, but let's face it, Fall Out Boy are a textbook example of an emo sellout." In 2018, Rock Sound put Take This to Your Grave at number 18 in their list of the 100 best pop-punk albums, describing it as "poetic and utterly brilliant", while 2005's From Under The Cork Tree was placed at number 3 behind only Green Day's Dookie and Blink-182's Enema of the State. Rock Sound described From Under the Cork Tree as "intelligent, intriguing and utterly intoxicating...They will still be talking about this one in 50 year's time."

In 2017, Fall Out Boy were announced as the first winners of Rock Sound's Hall of Fame Award as part of the Rock Sound Awards. In an interview accompanying the band's win, Patrick Stump stated one reason for the band's success is "Sugar, We're Goin Down", explaining that the "song changed my life, I have a music career in a large part due to that song". The staff of Consequence ranked the band at number 23 on their list of "The 100 Best Pop Punk Bands" in 2019.

In 2009, Phoenix New Times writer Martin Cizmar had described "Sugar, We're Goin Down" as possibly "the most listened-to emo track of all time".

As of 2020, the band are two-time Grammy Award nominees, their first nomination having been for Best New Artist at the 2006 Grammy Awards and their second for Best Rock Album for their 2018 album MANIA at the 2019 Grammy Awards.

On July 30, 2020, the band were nominated for "Best Rock Video" for the song "Dear Future Self (Hands Up)" at the 2020 MTV Video Music Awards, which makes them the most nominated band in history for the category.

In 2025, Collider said "Thnks fr th Mmrs" was the fourth greatest pop-punk song of all time. That same year, Screen Rant included the album in its list of "perfect pop-punk albums".

== Band members ==
Fall Out Boy live at Rock im Park 2014

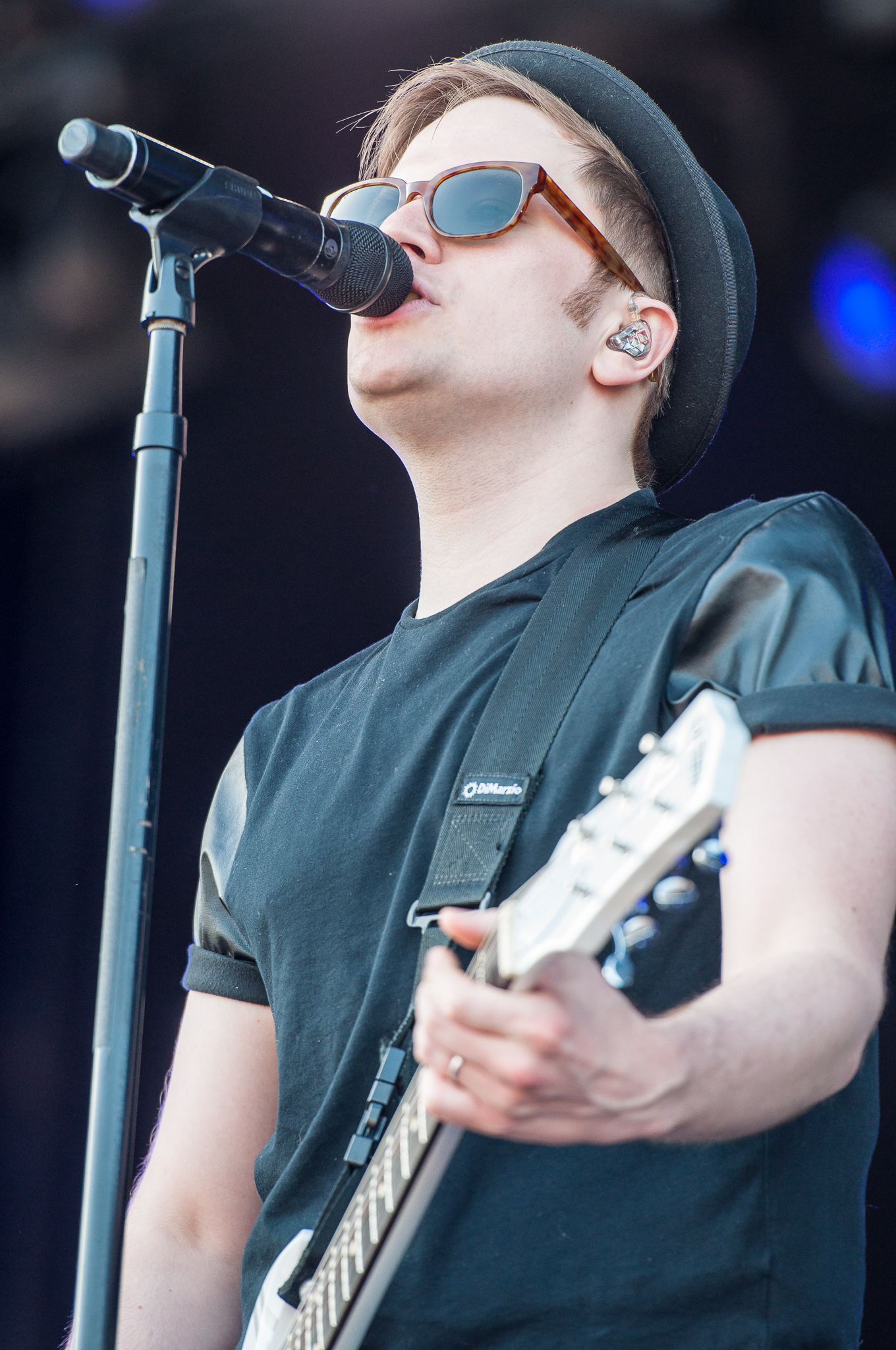
Patrick Stump

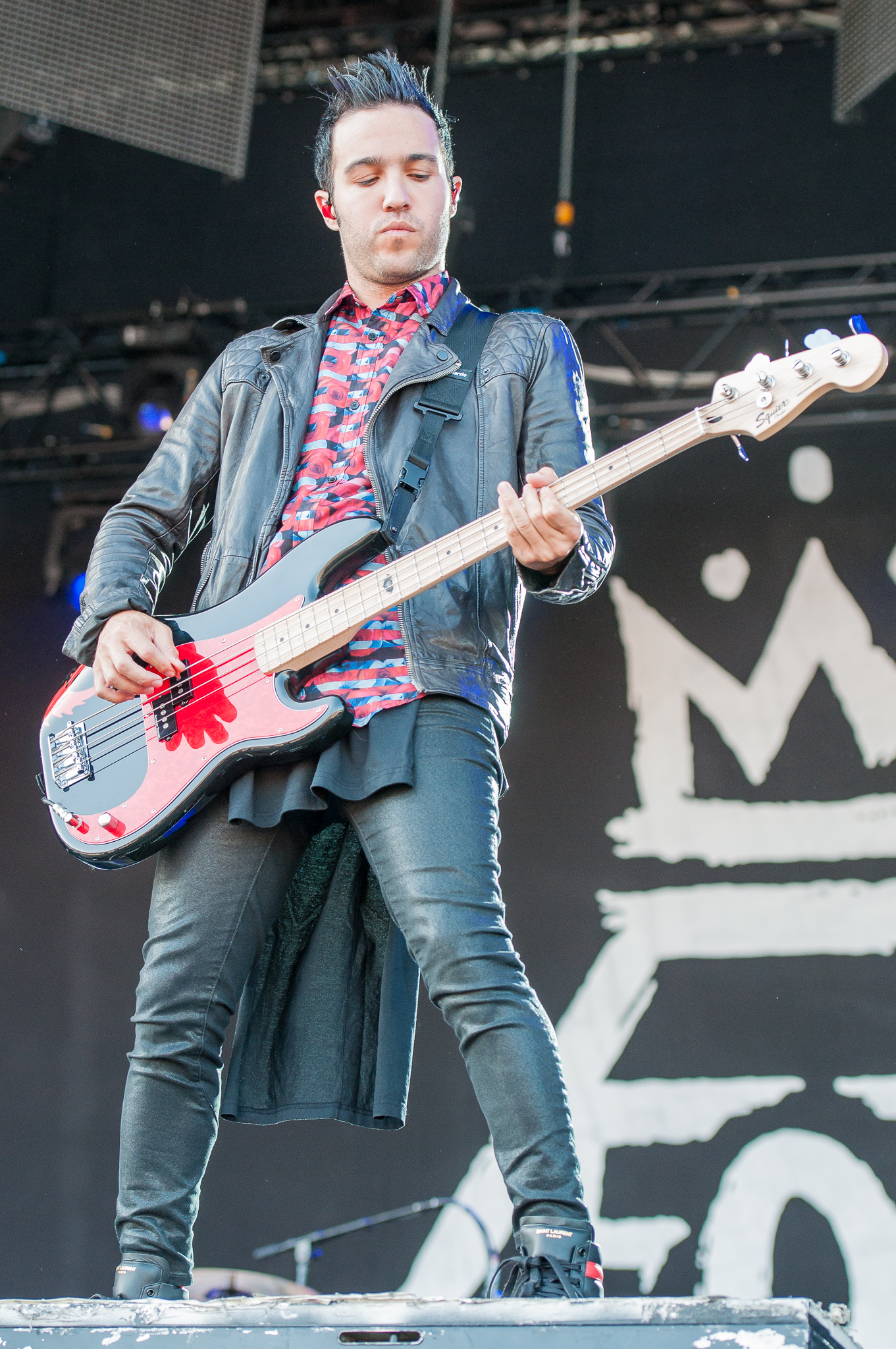
Pete Wentz

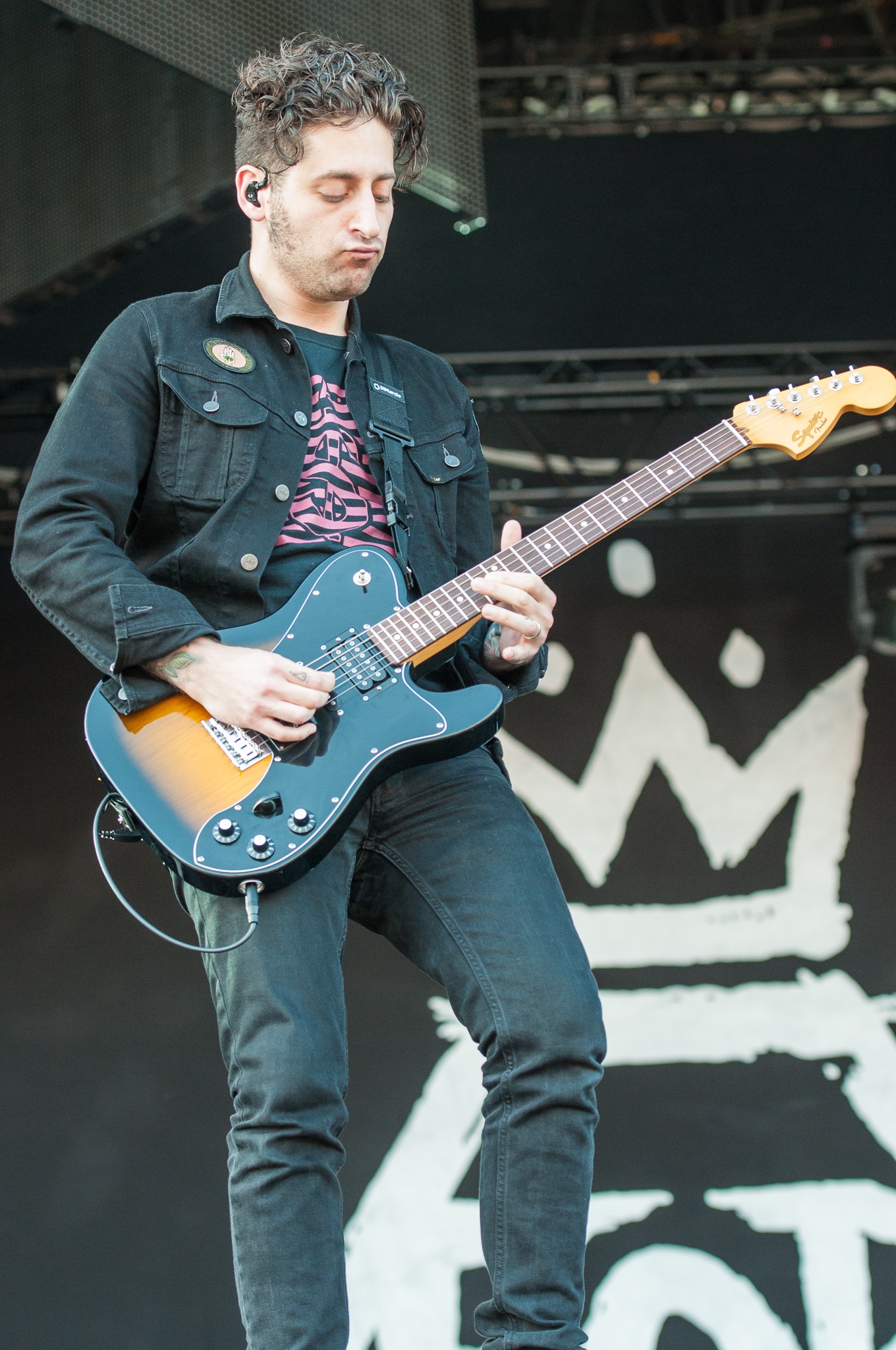
Joe Trohman

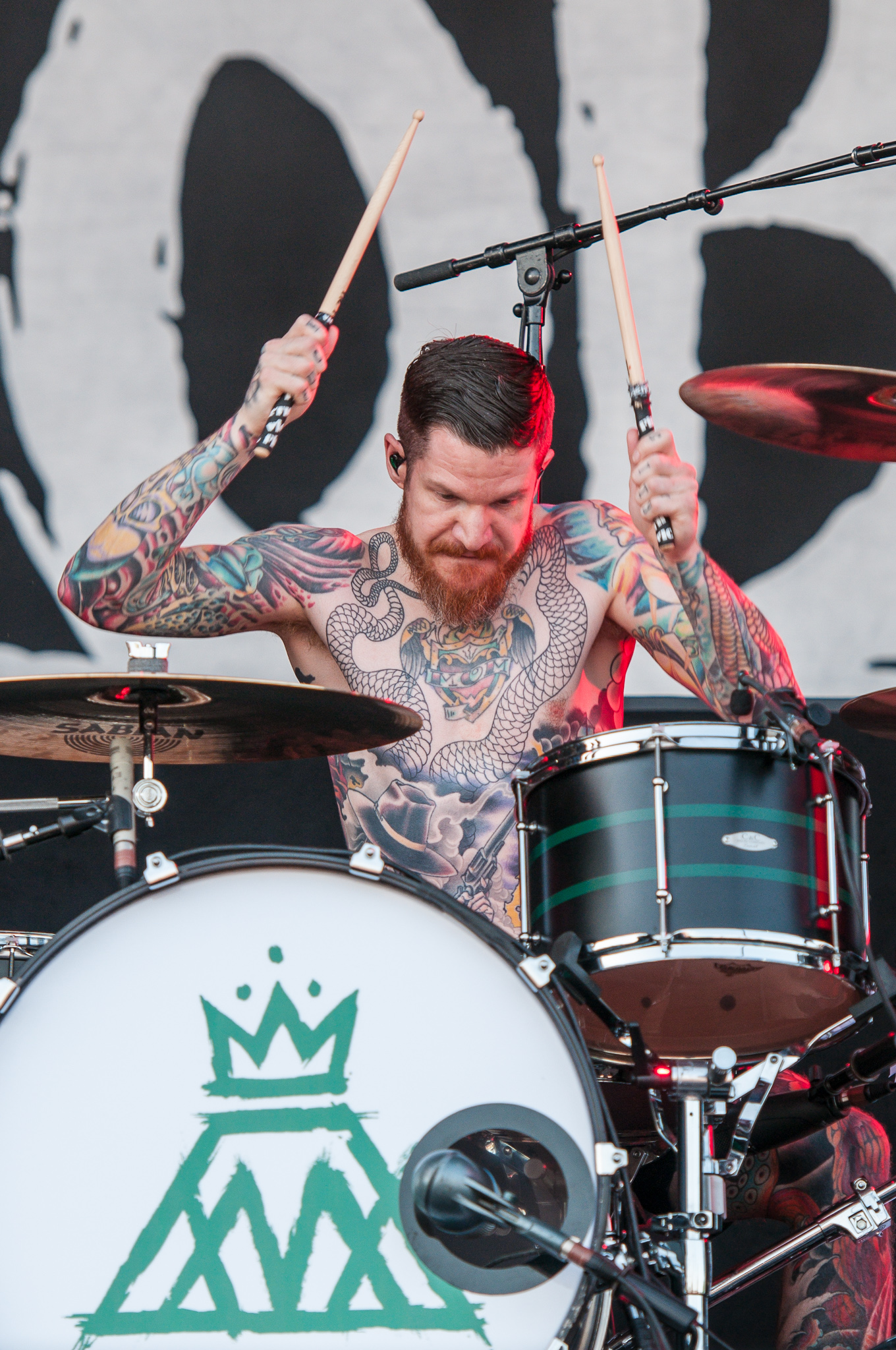
Andy Hurley

Current

- Patrick Stump – lead vocals (2001–2009, 2013–present), guitar (2002–2009, 2013–present), keyboards (2004–2009, 2013–present), additional percussion (2014–present)
- Pete Wentz – bass guitar, unclean and backing vocals (2001–2009, 2013–present)
- Joe Trohman – guitar, backing vocals (2001–2009, 2013–present), keyboards (2013–present) (Note: Trohman took a temporary hiatus in January 2023 due to mental health issues; however, he returned in May 2023. He took a second hiatus in 2025 to get surgery on his right hand.)
- Andy Hurley – drums, percussion (2003–2009, 2013–present), occasional backing vocals (2013–present)

Current touring musicians

- Max Bernstein – guitar (2025–present; substitute for Joe Trohman)

Former

- Ben Rose – drums, percussion (2001)
- John Flamandan – guitar (2001)
- T.J. Kunasch – guitar (2001–2002)
- Mike Pareskuwicz – drums, percussion (2001–2003)
- Brandon Hamm – guitar (2002)

Former touring musicians

- Ben Young – guitar (2023; substitute for Joe Trohman)

Timeline

== Discography ==
Studio albums

- Take This to Your Grave (2003)
- From Under the Cork Tree (2005)
- Infinity on High (2007)
- Folie à Deux (2008)
- Save Rock and Roll (2013)
- American Beauty/American Psycho (2015)
- Mania (2018)
- So Much (for) Stardust (2023)

== Tours ==
- The Believers Never Die (2004)
- Nintendo Fusion Tour (2005)
- Black Clouds and Underdogs Tour (2006)
- Honda Civic Tour (2007)
- Young Wild Things Tour (2007)
- Believers Never Die Part Deux Tour (2009)
- Save Rock and Roll World Tour (2013–2014)
- Monumentour (2014)
- American Beauty/American Psycho Tour (2015)
- Wintour is Coming (2016)
- Mania Tour (2017–2018)
- Hella Mega Tour (2021–2022)
- So Much For (Tour) Dust (2023–2024)
- Twilight of the Punks (2027)

== Awards and nominations ==
=== Alternative Press Music Awards ===
Year	Nominee / work	Award	Result	Ref.
2014	Themselves	Artist of the Year	Won	
2014	Themselves	Best Live Band	Nominated	
2014	Pete Wentz	Best Bassist	Nominated	
2014	Save Rock and Roll	Album of the Year	Nominated	
2014	"My Songs Know What You Did in the Dark (Light Em Up)"	Song of the Year	Nominated	
2015	"Centuries"	Best Music Video	Nominated	
2015	Overcast Kids	Most Dedicated Fans	Nominated	
2016	Patrick Stump	Best Vocalist	Won	
2016	Themselves	Artist of the Year	Nominated	
2017	Themselves	Artist of the Year	Nominated	

=== International Dance Music Awards ===
Year	Nominee / work	Award	Result	Ref.
2008	"Thnks fr th Mmrs"	Best Alternative/Rock Dance Track	Nominated	

=== Kerrang! Awards ===
Year	Nominee / work	Award	Result	Ref.
2006	Themselves	Best Band on the Planet	Nominated	
2006	From Under the Cork Tree	Best Album	Nominated	
2006	"Sugar, We're Goin Down"	Best Single	Nominated	
2006	"Sugar, We're Goin Down"	Best Video	Won	
2007	"This Ain't a Scene, It's an Arms Race"	Best Video	Won	
2007	Infinity on High	Best Album	Nominated	
2007	Themselves	Best International Band	Nominated	
2013	Themselves	Best International Band	Nominated	
2013	Fall Out Boy at London Camden Underworld	Best Event	Nominated	
2013	"My Songs Know What You Did in the Dark (Light Em Up)"	Best Single	Nominated	
2013	"The Phoenix"	Best Single	Won	
2014	Themselves	Best International Band	Won	
2014	Save Rock and Roll Tour	Best Event	Won	
2014	Pete Wentz	Tweeter of the Year	Nominated	
2015	"Centuries"	Best Single	Nominated	
2015	Themselves	Best International Band	Nominated	
2016	Themselves	Best International Band	Nominated	
2022	Fall Out Boy	Kerrang! Inspiration Award	Won	

=== Teen Choice Awards ===
Year	Nominee / work	Award	Result	Ref.
2006	Themselves	Choice Music: Rock Group	Won	
2006	"Dance, Dance"	Choice Music: Single	Won	
2006	"Dance, Dance"	Choice Music: Rock Song	Won	
2007	"Thnks fr th Mmrs"	Choice Music: Rock Song	Won	
2007	Themselves	Choice Music: Rock Group	Won	
2008	Themselves	Choice Music: Rock Group	Nominated	
2008	Pete Wentz	Choice Red Carpet Fashion Icon: Male	Nominated	
2015	Themselves	Choice Music Group: Male	Nominated	
2015	"Centuries"	Choice Music Single: Group	Nominated	
2015	"Uma Thurman"	Choice Music: Rock Song	Nominated	
2015	The Boys of Zummer Tour (with Wiz Khalifa)	Choice Summer Tour	Nominated	
2016	Themselves	Choice Music: Group	Nominated	

=== Other awards ===
Year	Nominee / work	Award	Result	Ref.
2004	"Grand Theft Autumn/Where Is Your Boy"	MtvU Woodie Award – Streaming Artist	Won	
2005	"Sugar, We're Goin Down"	MTV Video Music Award – MTV2 Award	Won	
2006	"Dance, Dance"	MuchMusic Video Award – People's Choice: Favorite International Group	Won	
2006	"Dance, Dance"	MTV Video Music Award – Viewer's Choice	Won	
2006	Fall Out Boy	Grammy Award for Best New Artist	Nominated	
2007	"Thnks fr th Mmrs"	Nickelodeon's Australian Kids' Choice Awards – Fave Song	Won	
2007	"Thnks fr th Mmrs"	Nickelodeon's Kids' Choice Award – Single	Won	
2007	Fall Out Boy	MTV Video Music Award – Best Group	Won	
2007	Fall Out Boy	Nickelodeon's Kids Choice Award – Best Band	Nominated	
2008	"The Take Over, the Breaks Over"	MuchMusic Video Award – People's Choice: Favorite International Video	Won	
2008	Fall Out Boy	TMF Award – Best Live International	Won	
2008	Fall Out Boy	TMF Award – Best Rock International	Won	
2008	Fall Out Boy	TMF Award – Best Alternative International	Won	
2008	"Beat It"	MTV Video Music Award – Best Rock Video	Nominated	
2009	"I Don't Care"	NRJ Music Award – Best International Band	Nominated	
2013	"My Songs Know What You Did in the Dark (Light Em Up)"	MTV Video Music Award for Best Rock Video	Nominated	
2013	Fall Out Boy	MTV Europe Music Awards – Best Alternative	Nominated	
2014	Fall Out Boy	People's Choice Awards – Favorite Alternative Band	Won	
2014	Fall Out Boy	Billboard Music Awards – Top Rock Artist	Nominated	
2014	Save Rock and Roll	Billboard Music Awards – Top Rock Album	Nominated	
2014	Fall Out Boy & The Band Perry	CMT Music Awards – CMT Performance of the Year	Nominated	
2014	Fall Out Boy	World Music Awards – World's Best Alternative Act	Won	
2014	Fall Out Boy	World Music Awards – World's Best Group	Nominated	
2014	Fall Out Boy	World Music Awards – World's Best Live Act	Nominated	
2014	Save Rock and Roll	World Music Awards – World's Best Album	Nominated	
2014	"My Songs Know What You Did in the Dark (Light Em Up)"	World Music Awards – World's Best Song	Nominated	
2014	"My Songs Know What You Did in the Dark (Light Em Up)"	World Music Awards – World's Best Music Video	Nominated	
2015	Fall Out Boy	Billboard Music Awards – Top Rock Artist	Nominated	
2015	"Centuries"	Billboard Music Awards – Top Rock Song	Nominated	
2015	"Uma Thurman"	MTV Video Music Award – Best Rock Video	Won	
2015	Fall Out Boy	American Music Awards – Favorite Alternative Band	Won	
2015	Fall Out Boy	People's Choice Awards – Favorite Group	Nominated	
2016	Fall Out Boy	Billboard Music Awards – Top Rock Artist	Nominated	
2016	"Uma Thurman"	Billboard Music Awards – Top Rock Song	Nominated	
2016	"Uma Thurman"	Radio Disney Music Awards – Best Song To Dance To	Nominated	
2016	Fall Out Boy	Radio Disney Music Awards – Best Music Group	Nominated	
2016	Fall Out Boy	MTV Video Music Award – Best Rock Video	Nominated	
2018	Fall Out Boy	MTV Europe Music Award – Best Alternative	Nominated	
2019	Mania	Grammy Award for Best Rock Album	Nominated	
2020	"Dear Future Self (Hands Up)"	MTV Video Music Award – Best Rock Video	Nominated	
2022	Fall Out Boy, Green Day, & Weezer	Hella Mega Tour	Nominated	
2023	"Hold Me Like a Grudge"	MTV Video Music Award – Best Alternative	Nominated	
2023	"Love from the Other Side"	MTV Video Music Award – Best Visual Effects	Nominated	
