= Fall Out Boy discography =

Discography of American rock band Fall Out Boy

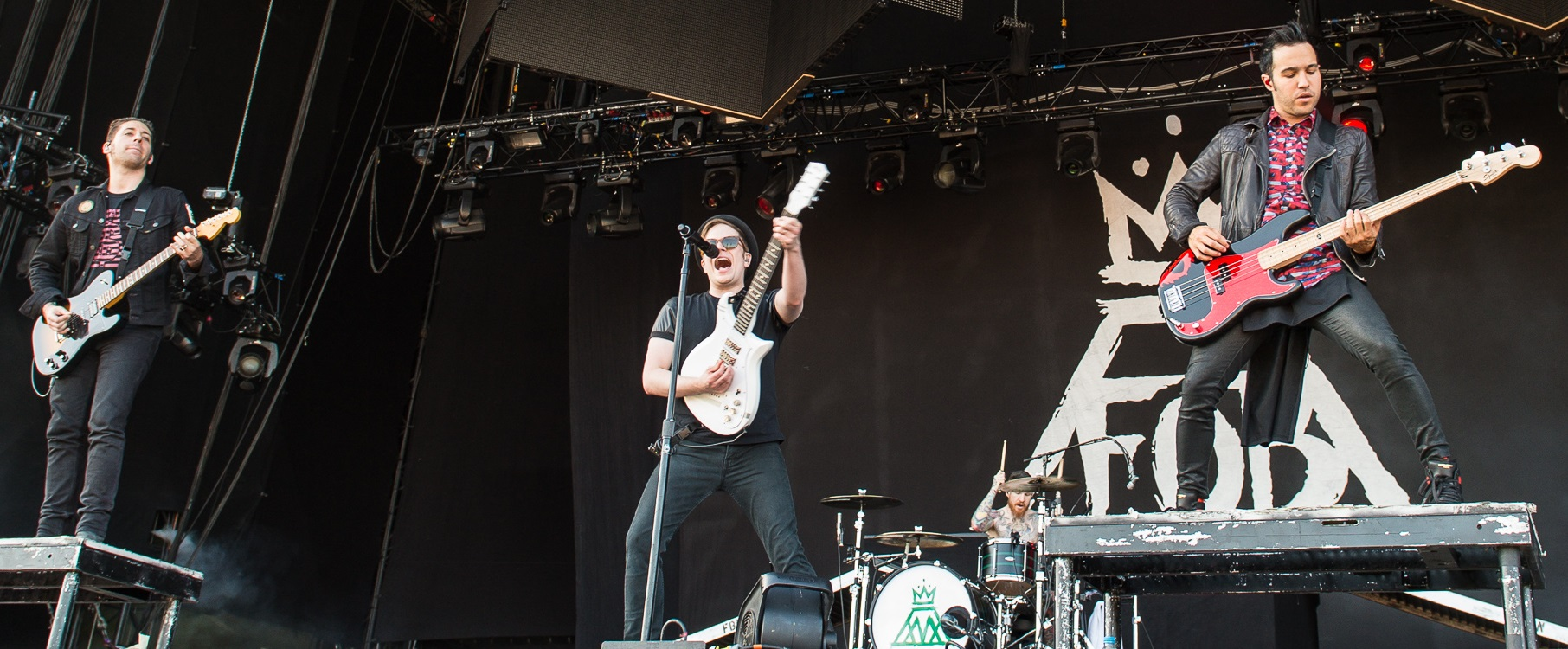
- Fall Out Boy performing at Rock im Park 2014. From left to right: Joe Trohman, Patrick Stump, Andy Hurley and Pete Wentz.
- Studio albums: 8
- Live albums: 4
- Compilation albums: 2
- Remix albums: 1
- Mixtapes: 1
- EPs: 9
- Singles: 49
- Music videos: 55

The American rock band Fall Out Boy has released eight studio albums, two live albums, two compilation albums, one remix album, one mixtape, nine extended plays, 49 (seven as a featured artist) singles, and 55 music videos. The band was formed in Wilmette, Illinois by friends Joe Trohman and Pete Wentz, who had played in local Chicago hardcore punk and heavy metal bands; Patrick Stump was soon recruited as the band's lead singer. They debuted with the split EP Project Rocket / Fall Out Boy (2002) and the mini-LP Fall Out Boy's Evening Out with Your Girlfriend (2003), both released on Uprising Records. After the release of the latter, drummer Andy Hurley joined Fall Out Boy and Stump picked up guitar, forming the band's current lineup. After signing to indie-label Fueled by Ramen, Fall Out Boy released their first full-length studio album, Take This to Your Grave, in May 2003. Following the album's release, the band signed with major label Island Records. Their second studio album From Under the Cork Tree was released in May 2005 to great commercial success, peaking at number nine on the United States Billboard 200 and being certified five-times platinum by the Recording Industry Association of America (RIAA). The album's popularity was aided by the success of its first two singles, "Sugar, We're Goin Down" and "Dance, Dance", which both became top ten hits on the US Billboard Hot 100 and eventually sold over two million downloads each.

Fall Out Boy's third studio album Infinity on High was released in February 2007, debuting at number one on the Billboard 200 with 260,000 first week sales and being certified triple platinum by the RIAA. "This Ain't a Scene, It's an Arms Race", the album's lead single, peaked at number two on the Billboard Hot 100 and also hit the top ten in countries such as Canada, New Zealand and the United Kingdom. The second single commissioned, "Thnks fr th Mmrs", peaked at number eleven on the Hot 100 and sold 3 million downloads. Infinity on High also produced the singles ""The Take Over, the Breaks Over"" and "I'm Like a Lawyer with the Way I'm Always Trying to Get You Off (Me & You)". The band released their fourth studio album Folie à Deux in December 2008; it debuted at number eight on the Billboard 200 with 149,000 first week sales and was certified Platinum by the RIAA. Four singles were released from Folie à Deux – the most successful of these was the platinum-certified "I Don't Care", which peaked at number 21 on the Hot 100.

Fall Out Boy released the compilation album Believers Never Die – Greatest Hits in November 2009. Following the album's release, the band announced that they would be going on an indefinite hiatus. The group announced the end of their hiatus four years later, releasing the single "My Songs Know What You Did in the Dark (Light Em Up)"; it peaked at number thirteen on the Billboard Hot 100 and went nine-times platinum. Their fifth studio album Save Rock and Roll was released on April 16, 2013. It debuted at number one on the Billboard 200 with 154,000 first week sales. PAX AM Days, a punk and hardcore-influenced EP, followed later in the year on October 15. "Centuries" was released as the sixth album's lead single in September 2014, peaking on the Hot 100 at number 10 and being Diamond. Sixth album American Beauty/American Psycho, released in January 2015, became the band's third Billboard 200 number one, with 192,000 first week sales. On January 19, 2018, their seventh studio album, Mania, was released and became their third Billboard 200 number one in a row and their fourth overall. Their eighth studio album So Much (for) Stardust was released on March 24, 2023.

== Albums ==
=== Studio albums ===
List of studio albums, with selected chart positions, sales figures and certifications
Title	Album details	Peak chart positions										Sales	Certifications
Title	Album details	US	AUS	CAN	FRA	GER	IRL	JPN	NZ	SWI	UK	Sales	Certifications
Take This to Your Grave	Released: May 6, 2003 (US); Label: Fueled by Ramen; Formats: CD, LP	140	—	—	—	—	—	—	—	—	96	US: 634,000	RIAA: Gold; BPI: Gold
From Under the Cork Tree	Released: May 3, 2005 (US); Label: Island; Formats: CD, CS, DL, LP	9	87	1	131	—	32	86	9	—	12	US: 2,700,000	RIAA: 5× Platinum; BPI: Platinum; MC: 2× Platinum; RMNZ: Platinum
Infinity on High	Released: February 6, 2007 (US); Label: Island; Formats: CD, DL, LP	1	4	2	17	25	6	11	1	75	3	US: 1,400,000; UK: 446,807	RIAA: 3× Platinum; ARIA: 2× Platinum; BPI: 2× Platinum; IRMA: Platinum; MC: Platinum; RIAJ: Gold; RMNZ: 2× Platinum
Folie à Deux	Released: December 16, 2008 (US); Label: Island; Formats: CD, DL, LP	8	9	21	41	48	52	6	26	84	39	US: 449,000	RIAA: Platinum; ARIA: Platinum; BPI: Gold; RMNZ: Gold
Save Rock and Roll	Released: April 16, 2013 (US); Label: Island; Formats: CD, DL, LP	1	2	1	25	15	4	9	2	31	2		RIAA: 2× Platinum; BPI: Platinum; MC: Gold; RMNZ: Platinum
American Beauty/American Psycho	Released: January 16, 2015 (US); Label: Island, DCD2; Formats: CD, DL, LP	1	3	1	55	12	6	9	4	15	2		RIAA: 3× Platinum; BPI: Platinum; MC: Gold; RMNZ: Platinum
Mania	Released: January 19, 2018; Label: Island, DCD2; Formats: CD, DL, LP	1	3	2	50	5	12	15	6	10	2	US: 558,000	RIAA: Gold; BPI: Gold
So Much (for) Stardust	Released: March 24, 2023; Label: Fueled By Ramen, DCD2; Formats: CD, CS, DL, LP	6	4	13	84	6	12	39	9	52	3		BPI: Silver
"—" denotes a recording that did not chart or was not released in that territory.

=== Live albums ===
List of live albums, with selected chart positions
Title	Album details	Peak chart positions					Certifications
Title	Album details	US Video	AUS	BEL (WA)	JPN	UK	Certifications
Live in Phoenix	Released: April 1, 2008 (US); Label: Island; Formats: CD, DL, DVD	1	32	51	114	147	RIAA: Platinum; ARIA: Gold
Live in Tokyo	Released: August 7, 2013 (JPN); Label: Universal Japan; Formats: CD, DVD	—	—	—	126	—	
The Boys Of Zummer Tour: Live In Chicago	Released: October 21, 2016; Label: Island, DCD2, Crush, Eagle Rock Entertainment; Formats: DVD	—	—	—	-	—	
So Much For (2our) Dust: Live At Madison Square Garden	Released: April 18, 2026; Label: Fueled By Ramen, DCD2; Formats: LP						
"—" denotes a recording that did not chart or was not released in that territory.

=== Compilation albums ===
List of compilation albums, with selected chart positions
Title	Album details	Peak chart positions								Certifications
Title	Album details	US	US Alt.	US Rock	AUS	JPN	IRL	SCO	UK	Certifications
Believers Never Die – Greatest Hits	Released: November 17, 2009 (US); Label: Island; Formats: CD, DL, DVD	77	14	9	25	19	79	82	88	ARIA: Gold; BPI: Gold; RMNZ: Gold
Greatest Hits: Believers Never Die – Volume Two	Released: November 15, 2019; Label: Island; Formats: CD, DL, LP	59	5	4	—	62	—	—	—	BPI: Platinum

=== Remix albums ===
List of remix albums
Title	Album details	Peak chart positions		Certifications
Title	Album details	US	UK	Certifications
Make America Psycho Again	Released: October 30, 2015; Label: Island; Formats: CD, DL	107	88	BPI: Silver

=== Mixtapes ===
List of mixtapes
Title	Album details
Welcome to the New Administration	Released: August 18, 2008; Label: DCD2; Formats: DL

== Extended plays ==
List of extended plays, with selected chart positions
Title	Album details	Peak chart positions							Sales
Title	Album details	US	US Alt.	US Rock	AUS	SCO	UK	UK Rock	Sales
Project Rocket / Fall Out Boy (with Project Rocket)	Released: May 28, 2002 (US); Label: Uprising; Formats: CD	—	—	—	—	—	—	—	US: 25,000
Fall Out Boy's Evening Out with Your Girlfriend	Released: February 25, 2003 (US); Label: Uprising; Formats: CD	—	—	—	—	—	—	—	US: 127,000
My Heart Will Always Be the B-Side to My Tongue	Released: May 18, 2004 (US); Label: Fueled by Ramen; Formats: CD/DVD, DL	153	—	—	—	—	—	—	US: 121,000
Leaked in London	Released: February 6, 2007; Label: Island; Formats: DL	Free download							N/A
America's Suitehearts: Remixed, Retouched, Rehabbed and Retoxed	Released: April 27, 2009; Label: Island; Formats: DL	—	—	—	—	—	—	—	
PAX AM Days	Released: October 15, 2013; Label: Island, PAX AM; Formats: CD, DL, 7"	25	7	10	59	82	81	6	
Spotify Singles	Released: February 21, 2018; Label: Island, DCD2; Formats: Streaming	—	—	—	—	—	—	—	
Llamania (credited as Frosty & The Nightmare Making Machine)	Released: February 23, 2018; Label: Island; Formats: CDr	Given to select fans							N/A
Lake Effect Kid	Released: August 23, 2018; Label: Island; Formats: DL	—	—	—	—	—	—	—	
"—" denotes a recording that did not chart or was not released in that territory.

== Singles ==
=== As lead artist ===
List of singles, with selected chart positions and certifications, showing year released and album name
Title	Year	Peak chart positions										Certifications	Album
Title	Year	US	AUS	AUT	CAN	GER	IRL	NLD	NZ	SWE	UK	Certifications	Album
"Dead on Arrival"	2003	—	—	—	—	—	—	—	—	—	—		Take This to Your Grave
"Grand Theft Autumn/Where Is Your Boy"	2003	—	—	—	—	—	—	—	—	—	—	RIAA: Platinum	Take This to Your Grave
"Saturday"	2003	—	—	—	—	—	—	—	—	—	—		Take This to Your Grave
"Sugar, We're Goin Down"	2005	8	—	—	—	33	99	—	—	—	8	RIAA: Diamond; RIAA: Gold (Mastertone); BPI: 2× Platinum; MC: Gold; RMNZ: 3× Platinum	From Under the Cork Tree
"Dance, Dance"	2005	9	—	—	3	—	35	—	—	—	8	RIAA: 7× Platinum; BPI: 2× Platinum; MC: Platinum; RMNZ: 2× Platinum	From Under the Cork Tree
"A Little Less Sixteen Candles, a Little More "Touch Me""	2006	65	—	—	—	—	—	—	—	—	38	RIAA: Platinum; BPI: Silver	From Under the Cork Tree
"This Ain't a Scene, It's an Arms Race"	2007	2	4	48	4	54	5	41	1	34	2	RIAA: 4× Platinum; ARIA: Platinum; BPI: Platinum; RMNZ: Platinum	Infinity on High
"Thnks fr th Mmrs"	2007	11	3	74	12	67	17	81	11	53	12	RIAA: 8× Platinum; ARIA: Platinum; BPI: 2× Platinum; BVMI: Gold; MC: Platinum; RMNZ: 3× Platinum	Infinity on High
""The Take Over, the Breaks Over""	2007	—	17	—	—	—	24	—	30	—	48	RIAA: Gold; BPI: Silver; RMNZ: Gold	Infinity on High
"I'm Like a Lawyer with the Way I'm Always Trying to Get You Off (Me & You)"	2007	68	28	—	—	—	—	—	33	—	91	RIAA: Gold	Infinity on High
"Beat It" (featuring John Mayer)	2008	19	13	75	8	69	21	98	14	—	21	RIAA: Platinum; BPI: Silver	Live in Phoenix
"I Don't Care"	2008	21	20	73	35	62	31	—	—	—	33	RIAA: 2× Platinum; ARIA: Gold; BPI: Gold; MC: Gold; RMNZ: Gold	Folie à Deux
"America's Suitehearts"	2009	78	26	—	—	—	—	—	—	—	76	RIAA: Gold	Folie à Deux
"Headfirst Slide into Cooperstown on a Bad Bet"	2009	74	—	—	64	—	—	—	—	—	—		Folie à Deux
"What a Catch, Donnie"	2009	94	—	—	95	—	—	—	—	—	—		Folie à Deux
"Alpha Dog"	2009	—	60	—	—	—	—	—	—	—	—		Believers Never Die – Greatest Hits
"My Songs Know What You Did in the Dark (Light Em Up)"	2013	13	30	—	19	—	33	63	13	—	5	RIAA: 9× Platinum; ARIA: Platinum; BPI: 2× Platinum; BVMI: Gold; MC: 3× Platinum; RMNZ: 2× Platinum	Save Rock and Roll
"The Phoenix"	2013	80	86	—	73	—	72	—	40	—	36	RIAA: 2× Platinum; BPI: Platinum; RMNZ: Gold	Save Rock and Roll
"Alone Together"	2013	71	40	—	—	—	—	—	—	—	81	RIAA: 2× Platinum; BPI: Silver	Save Rock and Roll
"Young Volcanoes"	2013	—	—	—	—	—	—	—	—	—	64	RIAA: Platinum; BPI: Silver	Save Rock and Roll
"Centuries"	2014	10	55	62	26	71	59	— (Note: "Centuries" did not enter the Netherlands' Single Top 100 but peaked on the Netherlands' Single Tip Chart at number one.)	32	60	22	RIAA: Diamond; BPI: 2× Platinum; BVMI: Gold; GLF: Platinum; RMNZ: 3× Platinum	American Beauty/American Psycho
"Immortals"	2014	72	82	—	71	—	—	—	—	—	84	RIAA: 5× Platinum; BPI: Platinum; RMNZ: Platinum	Big Hero 6 (Original Motion Picture Soundtrack) & American Beauty/American Psycho
"American Beauty/American Psycho"	2014	—	—	—	—	—	—	—	—	—	61		American Beauty/American Psycho
"Uma Thurman"	2015	22	—	—	67	—	—	—	—	— (Note: "Uma Thurman" peaked at number 13 on the Sverigetopplistan Heatseeker chart.)	71	RIAA: 4× Platinum; BPI: Gold; RMNZ: Gold	American Beauty/American Psycho
"Irresistible" (featuring Demi Lovato)	2015	48	—	—	75	—	—	—	—	—	70	RIAA: 2× Platinum; BPI: Gold	American Beauty/American Psycho
"Ghostbusters (I'm Not Afraid)" (featuring Missy Elliott)	2016	—	—	—	—	—	—	—	—	—	— (Note: "Ghostbusters (I'm Not Afraid)" did not enter the UK Singles Chart, but peaked at number 84 on the UK Singles Sales Chart.)		Ghostbusters
"Young and Menace"	2017	— (Note: "Young and Menace" did not enter the Billboard Hot 100, but peaked at number two on the Bubbling Under Hot 100 Singles chart.)	97	—	—	—	—	—	— (Note: "Young and Menace" did not enter the NZ Top 40 Singles Chart, but peaked at number six on the NZ Heatseekers Singles Chart.)	—	67	RIAA: Gold	Mania
"Champion"	2017	— (Note: "Champion" did not enter the Billboard Hot 100, but peaked at number 18 on the Bubbling Under Hot 100 Singles chart.)	—	—	—	—	—	—	— (Note: "Champion" did not enter the NZ Top 40 Singles Chart, but peaked at number nine on the NZ Heatseekers Singles Chart.)	—	— (Note: "Champion" did not enter the UK Singles Chart, but peaked at number 61 on the UK Singles Sales Chart.)	RIAA: Gold	Mania
"The Last of the Real Ones"	2017	— (Note: "The Last of the Real Ones" did not enter the Billboard Hot 100, but peaked at number 23 on the Bubbling Under Hot 100 Singles chart.)	83	—	—	—	—	—	— (Note: "The Last of the Real Ones" did not enter the NZ Top 40 Singles Chart, but peaked at number seven on the NZ Heatseekers Singles Chart.)	—	84	RIAA: Platinum; BPI: Silver; RMNZ: Gold	Mania
"Hold Me Tight or Don't"	2017	—	—	—	—	—	—	—	—	—	99	RIAA: Gold	Mania
"Wilson (Expensive Mistakes)"	2018	—	—	—	—	—	—	—	—	—	—		Mania
"City in a Garden"	2018	—	—	—	—	—	—	—	—	—	—		Lake Effect Kid
"Dear Future Self (Hands Up)" (featuring Wyclef Jean)	2019	—	—	—	—	—	—	—	—	—	—		Greatest Hits: Believers Never Die – Volume Two
"Bob Dylan"	2019	—	—	—	—	—	—	—	—	—	—		Greatest Hits: Believers Never Die – Volume Two
"Love from the Other Side"	2023	— (Note: "Love from the Other Side" did not enter the Billboard Hot 100, but peaked at number 10 on the Bubbling Under Hot 100 Singles chart.)	— (Note: "Love from the Other Side" did not enter the Australian ARIA Singles Chart but peaked at number 49 on the ARIA Digital Track Chart.)	—	—	—	—	—	— (Note: "Love from the Other Side" did not enter the NZ Top 40 Singles Chart, but peaked at number 23 on the NZ Hot Singles Chart.)	—	68		So Much (for) Stardust
"Heartbreak Feels So Good"	2023	—	—	—	—	—	—	—	—	—	— (Note: "Heartbreak Feels So Good" did not enter the UK Singles Chart, but peaked at number 76 on the UK Singles Sales Chart.)		So Much (for) Stardust
"Hold Me Like a Grudge"	2023	—	—	—	—	—	—	—	— (Note: "Hold Me Like a Grudge" did not enter the NZ Top 40 Singles Chart, but peaked at number 19 on the NZ Hot Singles Chart.)	—	91		So Much (for) Stardust
"We Didn't Start the Fire" (Note: "We Didn't Start the Fire" was added as a bonus track for So Much (for) Stardust on streaming services in mid-2023.)	2023	94	— (Note: "We Didn't Start the Fire" did not enter the Australian ARIA Singles Chart but peaked at number five on the ARIA Digital Track Chart.)	—	85	—	—	—	— (Note: "We Didn't Start the Fire" did not enter the NZ Top 40 Singles Chart, but peaked at number eight on the NZ Hot Singles Chart.)	—	52	RIAA: Gold	So Much (for) Stardust
"So Much (for) Stardust"	2024	—	—	—	—	—	—	—	—	—	—		So Much (for) Stardust
"It Feels Like Christmas"	2025	94	29	—	58	—	31	—	— (Note: "It Feels Like Christmas" did not enter the NZ Top 40 Singles Chart, but peaked at number 1 on the NZ Hot Singles Chart.)	—	60		Non-album single
"Aces"	2026	— (Note: "Aces" did not enter the Billboard Hot 100, but peaked at number ten on the Digital Song Sales chart.)	—	—	—	—	—	—	—	—	— (Note: "Aces" did not enter the UK Singles Chart, but peaked at number 40 on the UK Singles Sales Chart.)		TBA
"Doomsday Generation (Slacker for the Ages)" (featuring Walter Schreifels)	2026	—	—	—	—	—	—	—	—	—	— (Note: "Doomsday Generation (Slacker for the Ages)" did not enter the UK Singles Chart, but peaked at number 65 on the UK Singles Sales Chart.)		TBA
"—" denotes a recording that did not chart or was not released in that territory.

=== As featured artist ===
List of singles as featured artist, with selected chart positions and certifications, showing year released and album name
Title	Year	Peak chart positions										Certifications	Album
Title	Year	US	AUS	AUT	CAN	GER	IRL	NLD	NZ	SWE	UK	Certifications	Album
"One and Only" (Timbaland featuring Fall Out Boy)	2007	—	—	—	—	—	—	—	—	—	—		Shock Value
"One of Those Nights" (The Cab featuring Fall Out Boy)	2008	—	—	—	—	—	—	—	—	—	—		Whisper War
"Back to Earth" (Steve Aoki featuring Fall Out Boy)	2015	—	—	—	— (Note: "Back to Earth" did not enter the Billboard Canadian Hot 100, but peaked at number 60 on the Hot Canadian Digital Song Sales chart.)	—	—	—	—	—	—		Neon Future I
"Stayin Out All Night (Boys of the Zummer Remix)" (Wiz Khalifa featuring Fall Out Boy)	2015	—	93	—	—	—	—	—	—	—	—		Non-album single
"I've Been Waiting" (Lil Peep and ILoveMakonnen featuring Fall Out Boy)	2019	62	—	—	—	—	—	—	— (Note: "I've Been Waiting" did not enter the NZ Top 40 Singles Chart, but peaked at number 12 on the NZ Hot Singles Chart.)	— (Note: "I've Been Waiting" did not enter the Swedish Singellista Chart, but peaked at number 13 on the Swedish Heatseeker Chart.)	—	RIAA: Gold	Greatest Hits: Believers Never Die – Volume Two
"Summer Days" (Martin Garrix featuring Macklemore and Patrick Stump of Fall Out Boy)	2019	100	49	13	37	24	8	14	— (Note: "Summer Days" did not enter the NZ Top 40 Singles Chart, but peaked at number 12 on the NZ Hot Singles Chart.)	34	26	RIAA: Platinum; ARIA: Gold; BPI: Gold; IFPI AUT: Gold; MC: 2× Platinum	Non-album single
"Hand Crushed by a Mallet" (100 gecs featuring Fall Out Boy, Craig Owens, and Nicole Dollanganger)	2020	—	—	—	—	—	—	—	— (Note: "Back to Earth" did not enter the NZ Top 40 Singles Chart, but peaked at number 39 on the NZ Hot Singles Chart.)	—	—		1000 Gecs and the Tree of Clues
"—" denotes a recording that did not chart or was not released in that territory.

== Other charted songs ==
List of songs, with selected chart positions, showing year released and album name
Title	Year	Peak chart positions										Certifications	Album
Title	Year	US	US Rock	AUS	CAN	CZ	NZ	PHI	SWE Heat	UK	WW	Certifications	Album
"Our Lawyer Made Us Change The Name Of This Song So We Wouldn't Get Sued"	2005	—	—	—	—	—	—	—	—	—	—	RIAA: Gold	From Under the Cork Tree
"The Carpal Tunnel of Love"	2007	81	—	—	—	—	—	—	—	—	—		Infinity on High
"The (Shipped) Gold Standard"	2008	— (Note: "The (Shipped) Gold Standard" did not enter the Billboard Hot 100, but peaked at number 20 on the Bubbling Under Hot 100 Singles chart.)	—	—	—	—	—	—	—	—	—		Folie à Deux
"Where Did the Party Go"	2013	—	43	—	—	—	—	—	—	—	—	RIAA: Gold	Save Rock and Roll
"Just One Yesterday" (featuring Foxes)	2013	—	—	—	—	—	—	—	—	—	—	RIAA: Gold	Save Rock and Roll
"The Mighty Fall" (featuring Big Sean)	2013	—	47	—	—	—	—	—	—	—	—	RIAA: Gold	Save Rock and Roll
"Save Rock and Roll" (featuring Elton John)	2013	—	28	—	—	—	—	—	—	—	—	RIAA: Gold	Save Rock and Roll
"The Kids Aren't Alright"	2014	— (Note: "The Kids Aren't Alright" did not enter the Billboard Hot 100, but peaked at number 18 on the Bubbling Under Hot 100 Singles chart.)	10	—	—	—	—	—	—	189	—	RIAA: Gold	American Beauty/American Psycho
"American Beauty / American Psycho"	2015	—	—	—	—	—	—	—	—	—	—	RIAA: Gold	American Beauty/American Psycho
"Fourth of July"	2015	—	14	—	—	27	—	—	8	—	—	RIAA: Gold	American Beauty/American Psycho
"Jet Pack Blues"	2015	—	24	—	—	—	—	—	—	—	—	RIAA: Gold	American Beauty/American Psycho
"Novocaine"	2015	—	31	—	—	—	—	—	—	—	—	RIAA: Gold	American Beauty/American Psycho
"Twin Skeleton's (Hotel in NYC)"	2015	—	34	—	—	—	—	—	—	—	—	RIAA: Gold	American Beauty/American Psycho
"Favorite Record"	2015	—	37	—	—	—	—	—	—	—	—		American Beauty/American Psycho
"I Wan'na Be like You (The Monkey Song)"	2015	—	— (Note: "I Wan'na Be like You (The Monkey Song)" did not enter the Hot Rock Songs chart, but peaked at number 22 on the Rock Digital Song Sales chart.)	—	—	—	—	—	—	—	—		We Love Disney
"Stay Frosty Royal Milk Tea"	2018	—	19	—	—	—	—	—	—	93	—		Mania
"Wilson (Expensive Mistakes)"	2018	—	18	—	—	—	—	—	—	—	—		Mania
"Church"	2018	—	15	—	—	—	—	—	—	—	—		Mania
"Sunshine Riptide" (featuring Burna Boy)	2018	—	29	—	—	—	—	—	—	—	—		Mania
"Bishops Knife Trick"	2018	—	35	—	—	—	—	—	—	—	—		Mania
"Heaven's Gate"	2018	—	27	—	—	—	—	—	—	—	—		Mania
"Lake Effect Kid"	2018	—	18	—	—	—	—	—	—	—	—		Lake Effect Kid
"Super Fade"	2018	—	— (Note: "Super Fade" did not enter the Hot Rock Songs chart, but peaked at number 22 on the Rock Digital Song Sales chart.)	—	—	—	—	—	—	—	—		Lake Effect Kid
"Bob Dylan"	2019	—	— (Note: "Bob Dylan" did not enter the Hot Rock & Alternative Songs chart, but peaked at number 25 on the Alternative Digital Song Sales chart.)	—	—	—	—	—	—	—	—		Greatest Hits: Believers Never Die – Volume Two
"Fake Out"	2023	—	—	—	—	—	— (Note: "Fake Out" did not enter the NZ Top 40 Singles Chart, but peaked at number 39 on the NZ Hot Singles Chart.)	—	—	—	—		So Much (for) Stardust
"Electric Touch" (Taylor Swift featuring Fall Out Boy)	2023	35	—	38	46	—	35	22	—	— (Note: "Electric Touch" was not eligible to enter the Official Singles Chart, but peaked at number 58 on the Official Streaming Chart.)	37		Speak Now (Taylor's Version)
"Best Friend" (with Juice Wrld)	2024	— (Note: "Best Friend" did not enter the Billboard Hot 100, but peaked at number nine on the Bubbling Under Hot 100 Singles chart.)	12	—	—	—	—	—	—	—	—		The Party Never Ends
"—" denotes a recording that did not chart or was not released in that territory.

== Other appearances ==
List of guest appearances, with other performing artists, showing year released and album name
Title	Year	Album
"Save Your Generation"	2003	Bad Scene, Everyone's Fault: Jawbreaker Tribute
"Chicago Is So Two Years Ago"	2003	Hard To Get Volume 1: An Island Rarities Compilation
"Yule Shoot Your Eye Out"	2003	A Santa Cause: It's a Punk Rock Christmas
"Grand Theft Autumn" (acoustic)	2004	Atticus: Dragging the Lake 3
"Start Today"	2005	Tony Hawk's American Wasteland
"Nobody Puts Baby in the Corner" (acoustic)	2005	MySpace Records Vol. 1
"Roxanne"	2005	¡Policia!: A Tribute to the Police
"What's This?"	2007	The Nightmare Before Christmas: Special Edition
"One and Only" (Timbaland featuring Fall Out Boy)	2007	Shock Value
"One of Those Nights" (The Cab featuring Fall Out Boy)	2008	Whisper War
"Saturday Night's Alright for Fighting"	2014	Goodbye Yellow Brick Road: Revisited & Beyond
"Back to Earth" (Steve Aoki featuring Fall Out Boy)	2014	Neon Future I
"Stayin Out All Night (Boys of the Zummer Remix)" (Wiz Khalifa featuring Fall Out Boy)	2015	—N/a
"I Wan'na Be Like You (The Monkey Song)"	2015	We Love Disney
"The Night Begins to Shine"	2017	Teen Titans Go!
"I've Been Waiting" (Lil Peep and ILoveMakonnen featuring Fall Out Boy)	2019	Everybody's Everything
"Summer Days" (Martin Garrix featuring Macklemore and Patrick Stump of Fall Out Boy)	2019	—N/a
"Hand Crushed by a Mallet" (100 gecs featuring Fall Out Boy, Craig Owens, and Nicole Dollanganger)	2020	1000 Gecs and the Tree of Clues
"Electric Touch" (Taylor Swift featuring Fall Out Boy)	2023	Speak Now (Taylor's Version)
"Best Friend" (Juice Wrld featuring Fall Out Boy)	2024	The Party Never Ends

== Music videos ==
List of music videos, showing year released and director
Title	Year	Director(s)
"Dead on Arrival"	2003	Greg Kaplan
"Grand Theft Autumn/Where Is Your Boy"	2003	Dale Resteghini
"Saturday"	2003	Shane Drake
"Sugar, We're Goin Down"	2005	Matthew Lenski
"Sugar, We're Goin Down" (live)	2005	Jeff Seibenick
"Dance, Dance"	2005	Alan Ferguson
"A Little Less Sixteen Candles, a Little More "Touch Me""	2006	Alan Ferguson
"This Ain't a Scene, It's an Arms Race"	2007	Alan Ferguson
"The Carpal Tunnel of Love"	2007	Kenn Navarro
"Thnks fr th Mmrs"	2007	Alan Ferguson
"The Take Over, the Breaks Over"	2007	Alan Ferguson
"I'm Like a Lawyer with the Way I'm Always Trying to Get You Off (Me & You)"	2007	Alan Ferguson
"Beat It" (featuring John Mayer)	2008	Shane Drake
"I Don't Care"	2008	Alan Ferguson
"America's Suitehearts"	2009	Matthew Stawski
"What a Catch, Donnie"	2009	Alan Ferguson
"A Weekend At Pete Rose's" ("Headfirst Slide into Cooperstown on a Bad Bet") (featuring Panic! at the Disco)	2009	Shane Valdés
"Alpha Dog"	2009	Harvey White
"My Songs Know What You Did in the Dark (Light Em Up)"	2013	Donald/Zaeh
"The Phoenix"	2013	Donald/Zaeh
"Young Volcanoes"	2013	Donald/Zaeh
"Alone Together"	2013	Donald/Zaeh
"The Mighty Fall" (featuring Big Sean)	2013	Donald/Zaeh
"Love, Sex, Death"	2013	Brendan Walter
"Just One Yesterday" (featuring Foxes)	2013	Donald/Zaeh
"Where Did the Party Go"	2013	Donald/Zaeh
"Death Valley"	2013	Donald/Zaeh
"Rat a Tat" (featuring Courtney Love)	2014	Donald/Zaeh
"Miss Missing You"	2014	Donald/Zaeh
"Save Rock and Roll" (featuring Elton John)	2014	Donald/Zaeh
"Immortals"	2014	Unknown
"Centuries"	2014	Syndrome
"American Beauty/American Psycho"	2014	Syndrome
"Irresistible"	2015	Scantron
"Uma Thurman"	2015	Scantron and Mel Soria
"Back to Earth" (with Steve Aoki)	2015	Aaron Grasso
"Irresistible" (Doug the Pug version featuring Demi Lovato)	2015	Scantron
"Irresistible" (featuring Demi Lovato)	2016	Wayne Isham
"Young and Menace"	2017	Scantron and Mel Soria
"Champion"	2017	Scantron and Mel Soria
"The Last of the Real Ones"	2017	Justus Meyer
"Hold Me Tight or Don't"	2017	Brendan Walter and Mel Soria
"Wilson (Expensive Mistakes)"	2018	Y2K
"Church"	2018	Daveion Thompson
"Bishops Knife Trick"	2018	Scantron and No. 2 Pencil
"City in a Garden"	2018	Kevin Gutierrez
"I've Been Waiting" (with Lil Peep and ILoveMakonnen)	2019	Andrew Donoho
"Dear Future Self (Hands Up)" (featuring Wyclef Jean)	2019	Unknown
"Bob Dylan"	2019	Lewie & Noah Kloster
"Love From the Other Side"	2023	David Braun
"Heartbreak Feels So Good"	2023	Whitey McConnaughy
"Hold Me Like A Grudge"	2023	Brendan Walter
"So Much (For) Stardust"	2024	Brendan Walter
"Aces"	2026	Brendan Walter
"Doomsday Generation (Slacker for the Ages)"	2026	Unknown
