= Mania Tour =

2017–18 concert tour by Fall Out Boy

The Mania Tour
- Tour by Fall Out Boy
- Associated album: Mania
- Start date: September 10, 2017
- End date: October 8, 2018
- Legs: 6
- No. of shows: 50 in North America; 1 in South America; 16 in Europe; 5 in Oceania; 8 in Asia; 81 in total

Fall Out Boy concert chronology
- Wintour is Coming (2016); Mania Tour (2017–18); Hella Mega Tour (2021–22)

The Mania Tour (stylized as M A N I A Tour) was a headlining concert tour by Fall Out Boy, in support of the group's seventh studio album Mania (2018). The tour started with a special intimate show in Chicago on September 16, 2017, and concluded in New Orleans on October 10, 2018.

== Background and development ==
On April 27, 2017, the band released the first single and music video for "Young and Menace". With the release came the announcement of a fall arena tour. On July 13, 2017, the band announced a leg in Oceania, which is scheduled to take place in 2018. On January 19, 2018, Fall Out Boy announced the show at Wrigley Field, which took place on September 8, 2018.

== Set list ==
This set list is from the concert on September 8, 2018 in Chicago. It is not intended to represent all shows from the tour.

1. "Disloyal Order of Water Buffaloes"
2. "The Phoenix"
3. "Irresistible"
4. "Sugar, We're Goin Down"
5. "American Beauty/American Psycho"
6. "Immortals"
7. "Lake Effect Kid"
8. "Stay Frosty Royal Milk Tea"
9. "Thriller"
10. "Uma Thurman"
11. "Save Rock and Roll"
12. "The Last of the Real Ones"
13. "Young and Menace"
14. "Dance, Dance"
15. "Wilson (Expensive Mistakes)"
16. "Thnks fr th Mmrs"
17. "I Don't Care"
18. "This Ain't a Scene, It's an Arms Race"
19. "Chicago Is So Two Years Ago"
20. "Champion"
21. "Grand Theft Autumn/Where Is Your Boy"
22. "Centuries"
  Encore
23. "My Songs Know What You Did in the Dark (Light Em Up)"
24. "Saturday"

== Tour dates ==
List of concerts, showing date, city, country, venue, opening acts, tickets sold, number of available tickets and amount of gross revenue
Date	City	Country	Venue	Opening acts	Attendance	Revenue
North America
September 16, 2017	Chicago	United States	House of Blues Chicago	—N/a	—N/a	—N/a
South America
September 21, 2017 (Note: The show on September 21, 2017, in Rio de Janeiro is a part of the Rock in Rio festival.)	Rio de Janeiro	Brazil	Barra Olympic Park	—N/a	—N/a	—N/a
Leg 1 – North America
October 20, 2017	Cleveland	United States	Quicken Loans Arena	Blackbear; Jaden Smith	—N/a	—N/a
October 21, 2017	St. Louis	United States	Scottrade Center	Blackbear; Jaden Smith	—N/a	—N/a
October 22, 2017	Saint Paul	United States	Xcel Energy Center	Blackbear; Jaden Smith	—N/a	—N/a
October 24, 2017	Detroit	United States	Little Caesars Arena	Blackbear; Jaden Smith	—N/a	—N/a
October 25, 2017	Toronto	Canada	Air Canada Centre	Blackbear; Jaden Smith	8,614 / 8,614	$456,337
October 27, 2017	Boston	United States	TD Garden	Blackbear; Jaden Smith	—N/a	—N/a
October 28, 2017	Brooklyn	United States	Barclays Center	Blackbear; Jaden Smith	12,140 / 12,140	$821,961
October 29, 2017	Philadelphia	United States	Wells Fargo Center	Blackbear; Jaden Smith	—N/a	—N/a
November 2, 2017	Fairfax	United States	EagleBank Arena	Blackbear; Jaden Smith	—N/a	—N/a
November 3, 2017	Charlotte	United States	Spectrum Center	Blackbear; Jaden Smith	—N/a	—N/a
November 4, 2017	Atlanta	United States	Philips Arena	Blackbear; Jaden Smith	9,309 / 11,586	$596,464
November 5, 2017	Tampa	United States	Amalie Arena	Blackbear nothing,nowhere.	—N/a	—N/a
November 7, 2017	Houston	United States	Toyota Center	Blackbear; Jaden Smith	—N/a	—N/a
November 8, 2017	Dallas	United States	American Airlines Center	Blackbear; Jaden Smith	8,177 / 12,560	$479,874
November 10, 2017	Denver	United States	Pepsi Center	Blackbear; Jaden Smith	—N/a	—N/a
November 12, 2017	Seattle	United States	KeyArena	Blackbear; Jaden Smith	—N/a	—N/a
November 14, 2017	Oakland	United States	Oracle Arena	Blackbear; Jaden Smith	7,262 / 7,262	$431,860
November 15, 2017	San Diego	United States	Viejas Arena	Blackbear; Jaden Smith	—N/a	—N/a
November 17, 2017	Inglewood	United States	The Forum	Blackbear; Jaden Smith	—N/a	—N/a
November 18, 2017	Phoenix	United States	Talking Stick Resort Arena	Blackbear; Jaden Smith	—N/a	—N/a
Leg 2 – Europe
January 8, 2018	Berlin	Germany	Lido	—N/a	—N/a	—N/a
January 10, 2018	Stockholm	Sweden	Debaser	—N/a	—N/a	—N/a
January 11, 2018	London	England	Electric Brixton	—N/a	—N/a	—N/a
Leg 3 – Oceania
February 28, 2018	Brisbane	Australia	Riverstage	WAAX	—	—
March 2, 2018	Sydney	Australia	Qudos Bank Arena	WAAX	11,264 / 11,904	$870,800
March 3, 2018	Melbourne	Australia	Margaret Court Arena	WAAX	—	—
March 5, 2018	Red Hill	Australia	Red Hill Auditorium	WAAX	—	—
March 7, 2018	Henderson	New Zealand	The Trusts Arena	Openside	—	—
Leg 4 – Europe
March 27, 2018	Birmingham	England	Arena Birmingham	Against the Current; MAX	—	—
March 28, 2018	Cardiff	Wales	Motorpoint Arena Cardiff	Against the Current; MAX	—	—
March 29, 2018	Manchester	England	Manchester Arena	Against the Current; MAX	—	—
March 31, 2018	London	England	The O_{2} Arena	Against the Current; MAX	—	—
April 3, 2018	Paris	France	Zénith Paris	Against the Current; MAX	—	—
April 4, 2018	Amsterdam	Netherlands	AFAS Live	Against the Current; MAX	—	—
April 6, 2018	Berlin	Germany	Max-Schmeling-Halle	Against the Current; MAX	—	—
April 7, 2018	Hamburg	Germany	Mehr! Theater	Against the Current; MAX	—	—
April 8, 2018	Munich	Germany	Zenith Munich	Against the Current; MAX	—	—
April 10, 2018	Düsseldorf	Germany	Mitsubishi Electric Halle	Against the Current; MAX	—	—
April 12, 2018	Brussels	Belgium	Forest National	Against the Current; MAX	—	—
Leg 5 – Asia
April 24, 2018	Osaka	Japan	Zepp Osaka Bayside	Fear, and Loathing in Las Vegas	—	—
April 25, 2018	Osaka	Japan	Zepp Osaka Bayside	Fear, and Loathing in Las Vegas	—	—
April 26, 2018	Tokyo	Japan	Nippon Budokan	My First Story	—	—
April 28, 2018	Nagoya	Japan	Zepp Nagoya	TBA	—	—
April 30, 2018	Singapore		Zepp@BIGBOX	TBA	—	—
May 2, 2018	Shanghai	China	Mercedes-Benz Arena	TBA	—	—
May 4, 2018	Shenzhen	China	Shenzhen Bay Sports Center	TBA	—	—
May 7, 2018	Beijing	China	Cadillac Arena	TBA	—	—
Europe
August 24, 2018 (Note: The shows on August 24 and 25, in Reading and Leeds are part of the Reading and Leeds Festival.)	Reading	England	Little John's Farm	—N/a	—N/a	—N/a
August 25, 2018	Leeds	England	Bramham Park	—N/a	—N/a	—N/a
Leg 6 – North America
August 29, 2018	Uniondale	United States	Nassau Coliseum	Machine Gun Kelly; Against the Current	—	—
August 31, 2018	Uncasville	United States	Mohegan Sun Arena	Machine Gun Kelly; Against the Current	—	—
September 1, 2018	Hershey	United States	Hersheypark Stadium	Machine Gun Kelly; Against the Current	—	—
September 2, 2018	Buffalo	United States	KeyBank Center	Machine Gun Kelly; Every Time I Die	—	—
September 4, 2018	Newark	United States	Prudential Center	Machine Gun Kelly; Every Time I Die	—	—
September 5, 2018	Pittsburgh	United States	PPG Paints Arena	Machine Gun Kelly; Every Time I Die	—	—
September 6, 2018	Grand Rapids	United States	Van Andel Arena	Machine Gun Kelly; Every Time I Die	—	—
September 8, 2018	Chicago	United States	Wrigley Field	Rise Against; Machine Gun Kelly	—	—
September 9, 2018	Columbus	United States	Nationwide Arena	Machine Gun Kelly; Beartooth	—	—
September 11, 2018	Nashville	United States	Bridgestone Arena	Machine Gun Kelly; Gym Class Heroes	—	—
September 12, 2018	Louisville	United States	KFC Yum! Center	Machine Gun Kelly; Gym Class Heroes	—	—
September 15, 2018 (Note: The show on September 15, 2018, in Atlanta is a part of Music Midtown festival.)	Atlanta	United States	Piedmont Park	—N/a	—N/a	—N/a
September 16, 2018	Orlando	United States	Amway Center	Machine Gun Kelly; Gym Class Heroes	—	—
September 18, 2018 (Note: The Greensboro show was postponed from September 14 to 18 due to the pending landfall of Hurricane Florence.)	Greensboro	United States	Greensboro Coliseum	Machine Gun Kelly; Gym Class Heroes	—	—
September 21, 2018	Kansas City	United States	Sprint Center	Machine Gun Kelly nothing,nowhere.	—	—
September 22, 2018	Oklahoma City	United States	Chesapeake Energy Arena	Machine Gun Kelly nothing,nowhere.	—	—
September 23, 2018	Austin	United States	Frank Erwin Center	Machine Gun Kelly nothing,nowhere.	—	—
September 25, 2018	El Paso	United States	Don Haskins Center	Machine Gun Kelly nothing,nowhere.	—	—
September 26, 2018	Tucson	United States	Tucson Arena	Machine Gun Kelly; L.I.F.T.	—	—
September 28, 2018	Las Vegas	United States	MGM Grand Garden Arena	Machine Gun Kelly; L.I.F.T.	—	—
September 29, 2018	Anaheim	United States	Honda Center	Machine Gun Kelly; L.I.F.T.	—	—
September 30, 2018	San Jose	United States	SAP Center	Machine Gun Kelly; L.I.F.T.	—	—
October 2, 2018	Boise	United States	Taco Bell Arena	Machine Gun Kelly; State Champs	—	—
October 3, 2018	Salt Lake City	United States	Vivint Smart Home Arena	Machine Gun Kelly; State Champs	—	—
October 5, 2018	Lincoln	United States	Pinnacle Bank Arena	Machine Gun Kelly; State Champs	—	—
October 6, 2018	Des Moines	United States	Wells Fargo Arena	Machine Gun Kelly; State Champs	—	—
October 7. 2018	Indianapolis	United States	Bankers Life Fieldhouse	Machine Gun Kelly; State Champs	—	—
October 9, 2018	North Little Rock	United States	Verizon Arena	Machine Gun Kelly; State Champs	—	—
October 10, 2018	New Orleans	United States	Smoothie King Center	Machine Gun Kelly; State Champs	—	—
Total					—	—
