= Greatest Hits: Believers Never Die – Volume Two =

Greatest hits album by Fall Out Boy
- Released: November 15, 2019
- Recorded: 2012–2019
- Genre: Pop; pop rock
- Length: 45:00
- Label: Island
- Producer: Fall Out Boy; Butch Walker; Jake Sinclair; J.R. Rotem; Omega; Young Wolf Hatchlings; Jesse Shatkin; Illangelo; IIVI; Brian Lee; Louis Bell; iLoveMakonnen; Brenton Devall; Wyclef Jean; Jens Siverstedt

Fall Out Boy chronology
Lake Effect Kid (2018)	Greatest Hits: Believers Never Die – Volume Two (2019)	So Much (for) Stardust (2023)

Singles from Greatest Hits: Believers Never Die
- 1. "I've Been Waiting" Released: January 31, 2019; 2. "Dear Future Self (Hands Up)" Released: September 10, 2019; 3. "Bob Dylan" Released: December 3, 2019

Professional ratings
Review scores
Source	Rating
AllMusic	3.5/5 stars
Kerrang!	4/5 stars

Greatest Hits: Believers Never Die – Volume Two is the second greatest hits album by American rock band Fall Out Boy, released through Island Records on November 15, 2019. It includes the single "Dear Future Self (Hands Up)" featuring Wyclef Jean. The album was supported by the Hella Mega Tour, which Fall Out Boy embarked with Weezer and Green Day. It was certified Silver by the BPI on 26 March 2021, denoting 60,000 sales.

== Background ==
The album follows ten years after the band released their first greatest hits album, Believers Never Die – Greatest Hits, in November 2009, which featured the band's singles from 2003 to 2008 and two new tracks, and was issued as they went on hiatus.

== Composition ==
The album contains eleven previously released singles from the band, including two unreleased tracks. Volume Two compiles hits from the band's initial post-hiatus work, consisting of 2013's Save Rock and Roll, 2015's American Beauty/American Psycho, and 2018's Mania, which took a noticeably more pop and pop rock approach. The album also contains the single "I've Been Waiting", a collaboration with artists Lil Peep and iLoveMakonnen.

== Track listing ==
All tracks are written by Fall Out Boy, except where noted.

No.	Title	Writer(s)	From album	Length
1.	"My Songs Know What You Did in the Dark (Light Em Up)"	Fall Out Boy; Butch Walker; John Hill	Save Rock and Roll (2013)	3:09
2.	"The Phoenix"		Save Rock and Roll	4:04
3.	"Alone Together"		Save Rock and Roll	3:23
4.	"Young Volcanoes"		Save Rock and Roll	3:24
5.	"Centuries"	Jonathan Rotem; Fall Out Boy; Michael J. Fonseca; Raja Kumari; Justin Tranter; Suzanne Vega	American Beauty/American Psycho (2015)	3:48
6.	"Immortals"		American Beauty/American Psycho	3:15
7.	"Uma Thurman"	Fall Out Boy; Jake Sinclair; Waqaas Hashmi; Jarrel Young; Liam O'Donnell; Jack Marshall; Bob Mosher	American Beauty/American Psycho	3:31
8.	"Irresistible"		American Beauty/American Psycho	3:26
9.	"Champion"	Stump; Wentz; Trohman; Hurley; Sia Furler; Jesse Shatkin	Mania (2018)	3:12
10.	"The Last of the Real Ones"	Stump; Wentz; Trohman; Hurley; Carlo Montagnese	Mania	3:50
11.	"I've Been Waiting" (with Lil Peep and ILoveMakonnen)	Gustav Åhr; Valentin Leon Blavatnik; Makonnen Sheran; Brenton Duvall; Louis Bell; Brian Lee; Stump; Wentz; Trohman; Hurley	Single release only	3:54
12.	"Dear Future Self (Hands Up)" (featuring Wyclef Jean)	Fall Out Boy; Wyclef Jean; Jens Siverstedt; Jonas Wallin; Noonie Bao; Alina Smith; Annalise Morelli	Previously unreleased	2:51
13.	"Bob Dylan"		Previously unreleased	3:13
Total length:				45:01

Japanese bonus tracks
No.	Title	From album	Length
14.	"Lake Effect Kid"	Lake Effect Kid (2018)	3:40
15.	"Church" (remix; featuring nothing,nowhere.)	Single release only	3:52
Total length:			52:32

== Charts ==
=== Weekly charts ===
Chart (2019)	Peak position
US Billboard 200	59
US Top Rock Albums (Billboard)	4

=== Year-end charts ===
Chart (2020)	Position
US Top Rock Albums (Billboard)	40

== Certifications ==
Region	Certification	Certified units/sales
United Kingdom (BPI)	Gold	100,000^{‡}
^{‡} Sales+streaming figures based on certification alone.
