= I've Been Waiting (disambiguation) =

I've Been Waiting may refer to:

- "I've Been Waiting", a song by the Iveys from their 1969 album Maybe Tomorrow
- "I've Been Waiting", a song by Matthew Sweet from his 1991 album Girlfriend
- "I've Been Waiting", a song by Lil Peep and ILoveMakonnen featuring Fall Out Boy
