= Wilson (Expensive Mistakes) =

Single by Fall Out Boy

from the album Mania
- Released: January 12, 2018
- Genre: Pop-punk; emo pop; pop rock
- Length: 3:37
- Label: Island; DCD2
- Songwriters: Pete Wentz; Patrick Stump; Joe Trohman; Andy Hurley
- Producers: Dave Sardy; Fall Out Boy

Fall Out Boy singles chronology
"Hold Me Tight or Don't" (2017)	"Wilson (Expensive Mistakes)" (2018)	"City in a Garden" (2018)

Music video
- "Wilson (Expensive Mistakes)" on YouTube

"Wilson (Expensive Mistakes)" is a song by American rock band Fall Out Boy, released on January 12, 2018, through Island Records and DCD2. It was released as the fifth single from their seventh studio album, Mania. A music video was released with the single.

== Composition ==
Sophie Trenear of The Edge described the song as having a "steadfast pop-punk chorus, while Jake Richardson of Loudwire called the song a "modern emo-pop number". Sarah Beckford of Reflektor noted that "Wilson (Expensive Mistakes)" is "on the lighter pop-rock side" of Mania.

The song bears a resemblance to The Clash's song "Straight to Hell", as well as British rapper M.I.A.'s song "Paper Planes".

== Promotion ==
=== TV performances ===
The band performed the song live on Good Morning America on January 22, 2018, along with "Hold Me Tight or Don't", another single from Mania. On April 17, 2018, the band performed the song on The Late Late Show with James Corden in promotion for the Mania Tour.

== Music video ==
The music video, directed by Jason Lester, was released to Fall Out Boy's Vevo channel on the same day the song was released. It portrays a parody of an infomercial, with the members of Fall Out Boy playing the song and auctioning off items from their past, such as the severed hand from the Young Blood Chronicles musical film. A phone number appears several times in the video. When called, the number allows you to fake "buy" the items on the video.

== Reception ==
Despite the mixed reception of Mania, "Wilson (Expensive Mistakes)" received positive reviews from critics. Anna Gaca of Spin called it the best song on Mania, while feeling it was reminiscent of "The Kids Aren't Alright" from American Beauty/American Psycho. Miles Ricketts of Varsity, in a negative review of Mania, felt that the song was "a comforting reminder" of the band's potential, while praising vocalist Patrick Stump's performance.

== Track listing ==
All tracks are written by Patrick Stump, Joe Trohman, Pete Wentz, Andy Hurley.

Digital download
No.	Title	Length
1.	"Wilson (Expensive Mistakes)"	3:37

== Personnel ==
Fall Out Boy

- Patrick Stump – vocals, rhythm guitar, songwriting, production
- Pete Wentz – bass guitar, songwriting, production
- Joe Trohman – lead guitar, songwriting, production
- Andy Hurley – drums, percussion, songwriting, production

Production

- Dave Sardy - production
- James Monti - engineer
- David Anderson - assistant engineer
- Geoff Neal - assistant engineer
- Neal Avron - mixing engineer
- Cameron Barton - additional engineering

== Charts ==
Chart (2018)	Peak position
US Hot Rock & Alternative Songs (Billboard)	18
