= Hella Mega Tour =

2021–22 concert tour by Green Day, Fall Out Boy, and Weezer

- Tour by Green Day, Fall Out Boy, and Weezer
- Location: Europe; North America
- Associated album: Father of All Motherfuckers; Greatest Hits: Believers Never Die – Volume Two; Van Weezer; OK Human
- Start date: July 24, 2021
- End date: July 2, 2022
- Legs: 2
- No. of shows: 29
Green Day tour chronology
Revolution Radio Tour (2016–17)	Hella Mega Tour (2021–22)	The Saviors Tour (2024–25)
Fall Out Boy tour chronology
Mania Tour (2017–18)	Hella Mega Tour (2021–22)	So Much For (Tour) Dust (2023–24)
Weezer tour chronology
Weezer & Pixies Tour (2018–19)	Hella Mega Tour (2021–22)	Indie Rock Road Trip (2023)

The Hella Mega Tour was a concert tour by American rock bands Green Day, Fall Out Boy, and Weezer that was announced on September 10, 2019, and originally included dates from March to August 2020. Due to the COVID-19 pandemic, the Oceanic leg was canceled, as was the sole Canadian date. The rest of the tour was rescheduled to 2021 and 2022.

== Background ==
On September 10, 2019, all three bands simultaneously announced the tour and new music. On the same day, each band also released a new single: Green Day released "Father of All..." and announced its 13th album, Father of All Motherfuckers; Fall Out Boy released "Dear Future Self (Hands Up)" and announced its second compilation album, Greatest Hits: Believers Never Die – Volume Two; and Weezer released "The End of the Game" and announced its fifteenth (fourteenth at the time) album, Van Weezer. Weezer would also go on to release their fourteenth studio album OK Human on January 29, 2021, preceded eight days earlier by the lead single "All My Favorite Songs".

== Overview ==
All three bands performed at 26 shows across the North American and European legs, excluding the three shows Fall Out Boy missed due to a positive COVID-19 case in their touring group. The venues consisted of outdoor and indoor stadiums as well as outdoor park venues. On February 28, 2020, Green Day announced all nine solo Asian tour dates were postponed due to the COVID-19 pandemic. On April 23, 2020, it was announced on the social media pages of the Hella Mega Tour that a number of the European dates would be postponed. On May 19, 2020, it was announced that all dates on the North American leg would be postponed to 2021. On July 15, 2020, it was announced that all dates on the Oceania leg would be cancelled and tickets refunded. On February 27, 2022, Green Day announced their solo concert in Moscow prior to the European Hella Mega Tour leg on May 29 would be canceled due to the 2022 Russian invasion of Ukraine.

== Set list ==
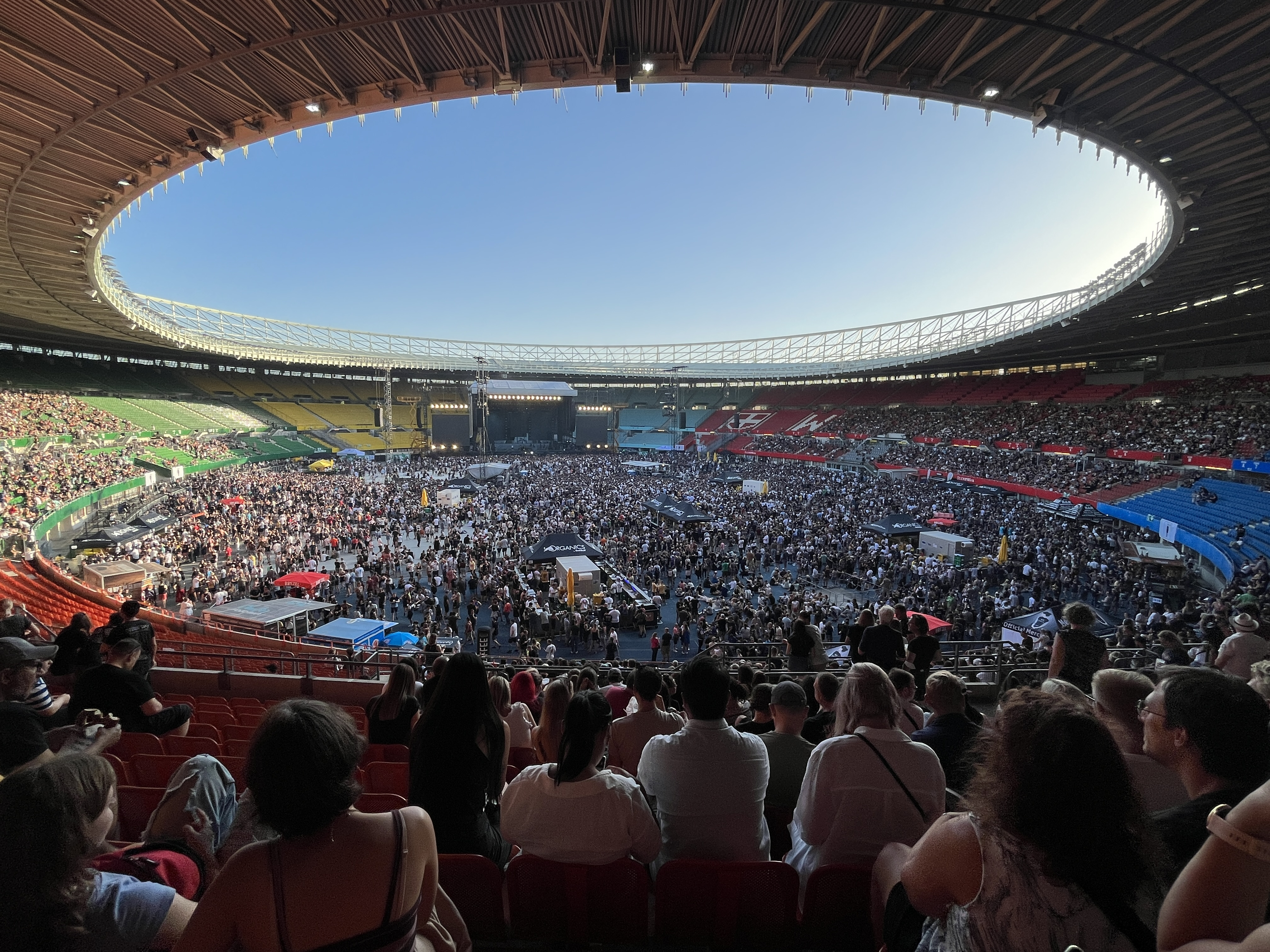
Hella Mega Tour, Vienna, June 19, 2022

This set list is from the concert on July 24, 2021, in Arlington, Texas. It is not intended to represent all shows from the tour.

=== Weezer ===
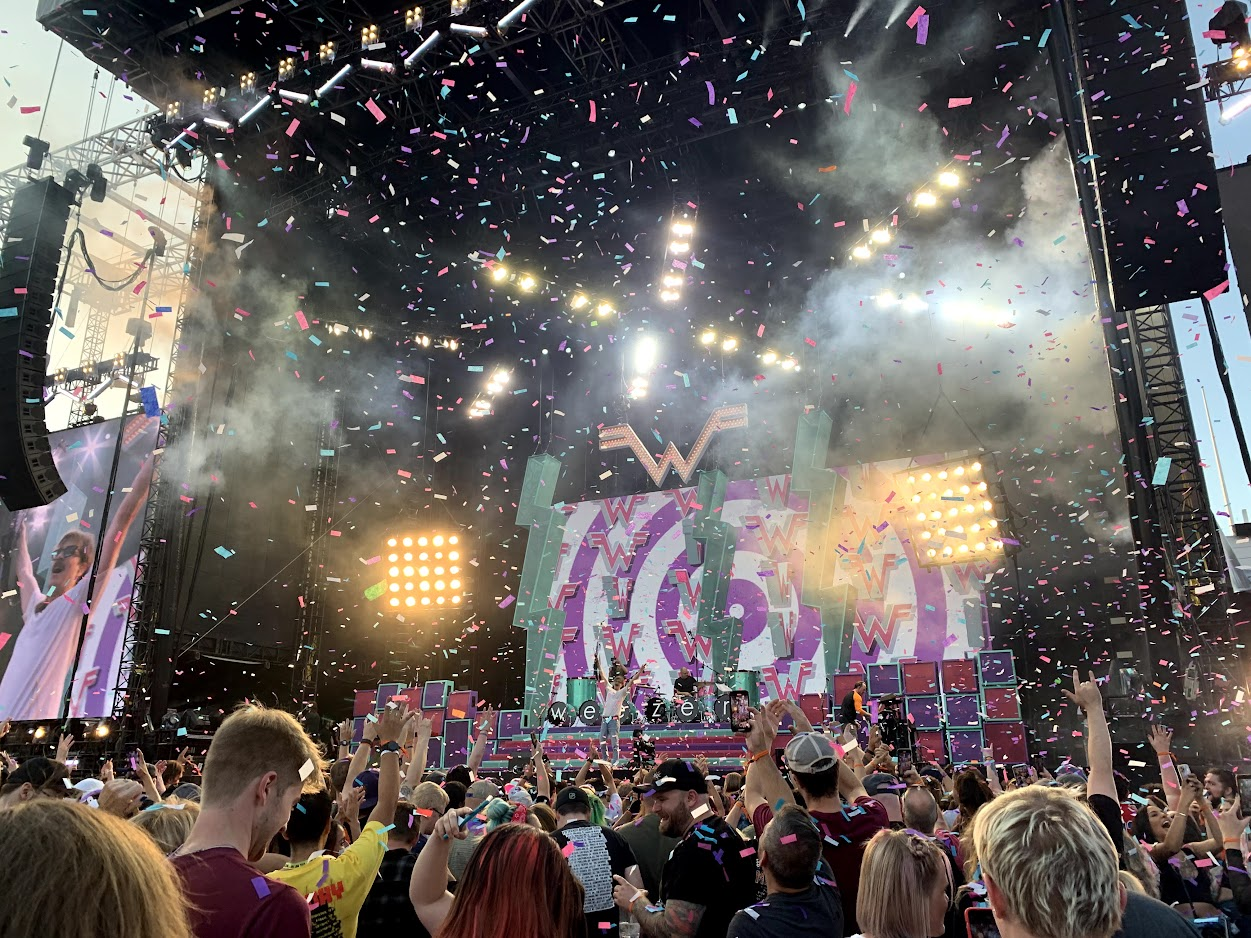
Weezer Hella Mega Tour Denver 2021

1. "Hero"
2. "Hash Pipe"
3. "All the Good Ones"
4. "Beverly Hills"
5. "The End of the Game"
6. "My Name Is Jonas"
7. "Pork And Beans"
8. "Feels Like Summer"
9. "All My Favorite Songs"
10. "Undone – The Sweater Song"
11. "Surf Wax America"
12. "El Scorcho"
13. "Island in the Sun"
14. "Africa" (Toto cover)
15. "California Snow"
16. "Say It Ain't So"
17. "Buddy Holly"

=== Fall Out Boy ===
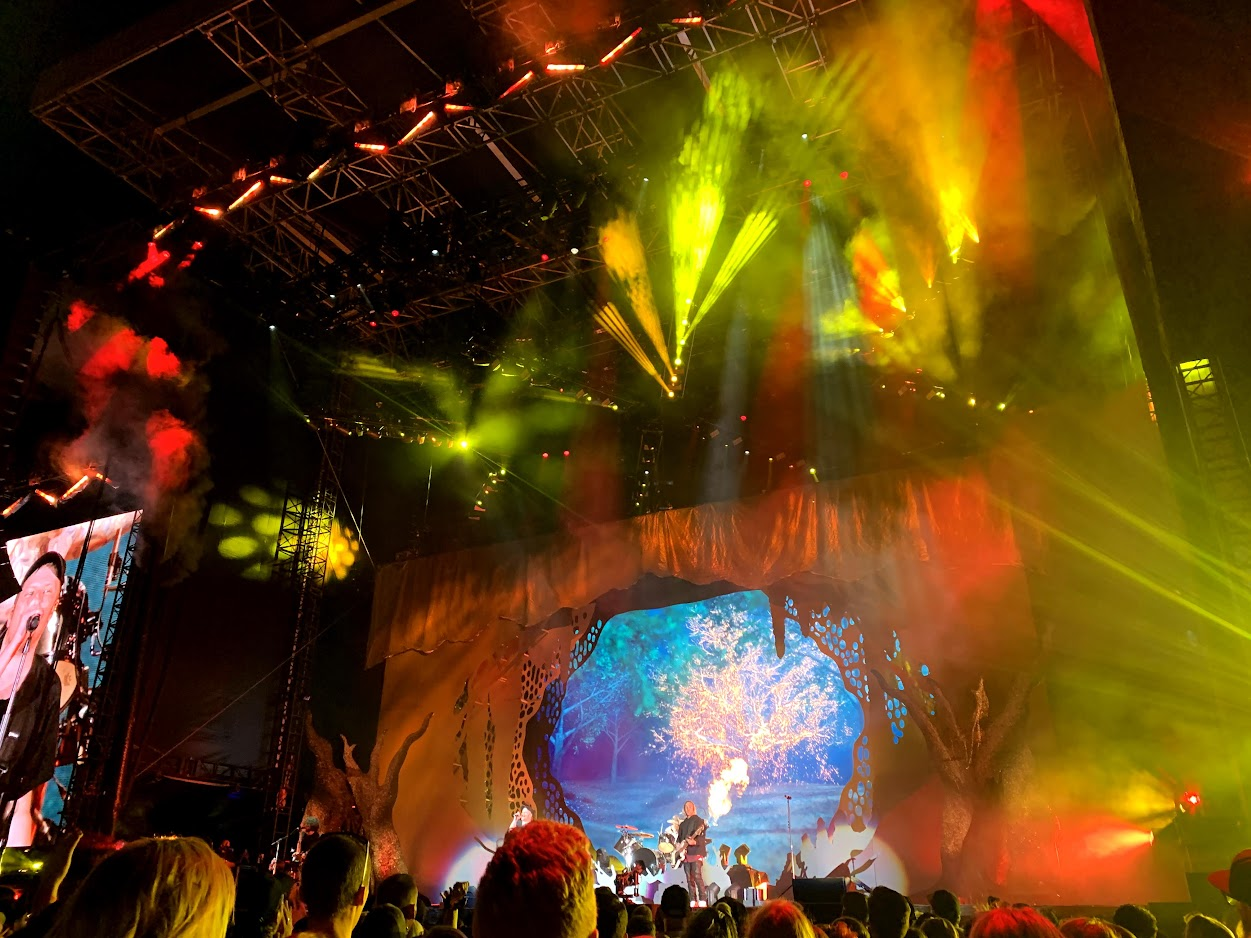
Fall Out Boy Hella Mega Tour Denver 2021

1. "The Phoenix"
2. "Sugar, We're Goin Down"
3. "Irresistible"
4. "Uma Thurman"
5. "Grand Theft Autumn/Where Is Your Boy"
6. "Save Rock and Roll"
7. "The Last of the Real Ones"
8. "Dance, Dance"
9. "A Little Less Sixteen Candles, a Little More "Touch Me""
10. "This Ain't a Scene, It's an Arms Race"
11. "My Songs Know What You Did in the Dark (Light Em Up)"
12. "I Don’t Care"
13. "Thnks fr th Mmrs"
14. "Centuries"
15. "Saturday"

=== Green Day ===
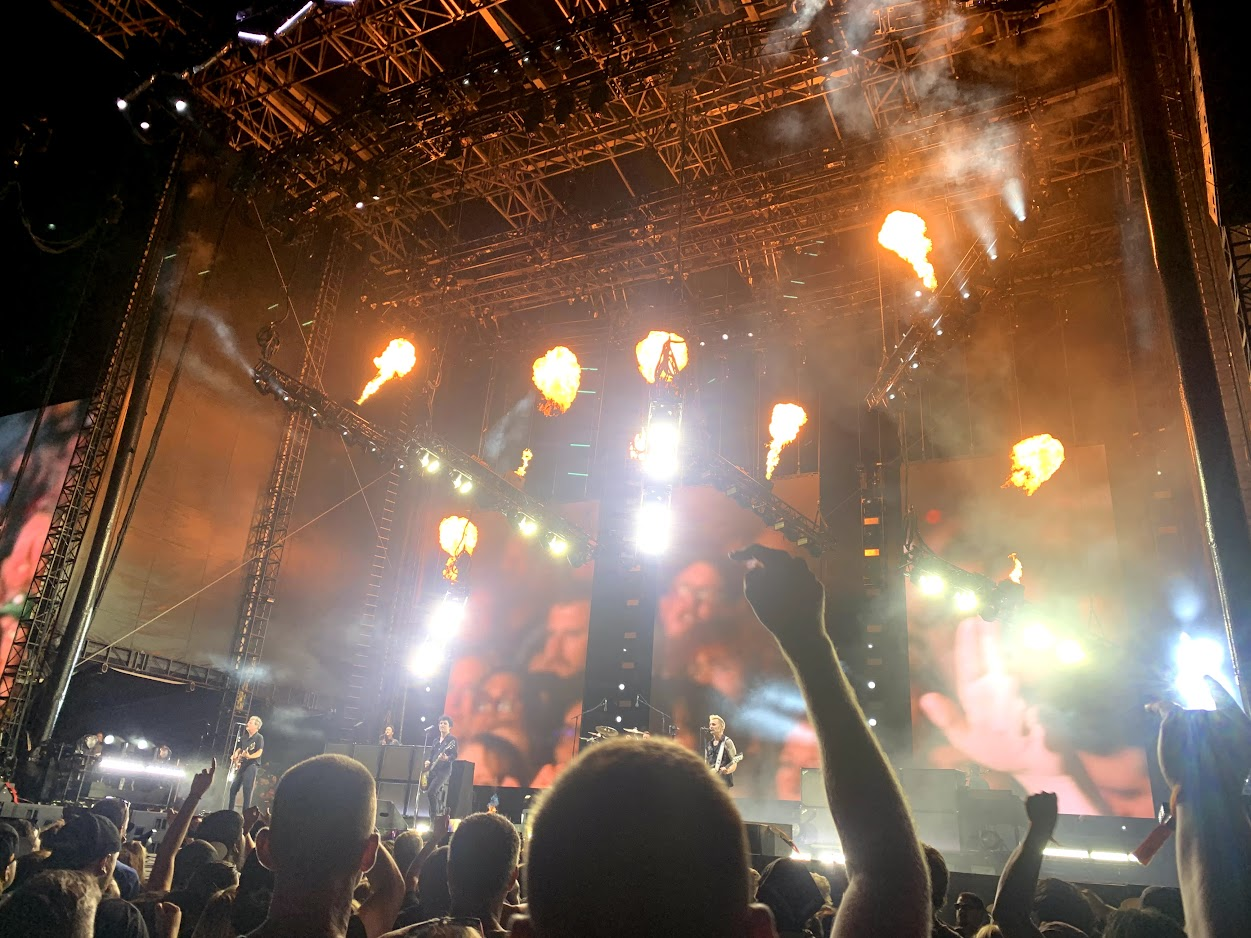
Green Day in Denver for the Hella Mega Tour

1. "American Idiot"
2. "Holiday"
3. "Know Your Enemy"
4. "Pollyanna"
5. "Boulevard of Broken Dreams"
6. "Longview"
7. "Welcome to Paradise"
8. "Hitchin’ a Ride"
9. "Rock and Roll All Nite" (Kiss cover)
10. "Brain Stew"
11. "St. Jimmy"
12. "When I Come Around"
13. "21 Guns"
14. "Minority"
15. "Knowledge" (Operation Ivy cover)
16. "Basket Case"
17. "She"
18. "Wake Me Up When September Ends"
19. "Still Breathing"
20. "Jesus of Suburbia"
21. "Good Riddance (Time of Your Life)"

=== Notes ===
- During the shows in New York City, Boston and Washington, D.C., Weezer performed a cover of "Sugar, We're Goin Down" after Fall Out Boy wasn't able to perform.
- For the European leg of the tour, Weezer changed their setlist around some to reflect their newly released EPs; SZNZ: Spring and SZNZ: Summer, as well as their recent cover of "Enter Sandman".
- Green Day also changed their setlist slightly during the European Leg, removing "Pollyanna", "She", and "Still Breathing" which were replaced with "Waiting", "King For a Day", and their cover of "Shout" by The Isley Brothers.

== Tour dates ==
List of 2021 concerts showing date, city, country, venue, opening act, attendance, and revenue
Date	City	Country	Venue	Opening Acts	Attendance	Revenue
July 24, 2021	Arlington	United States	Globe Life Field	The Interrupters	—	—
July 27, 2021	Cumberland	United States	Truist Park	The Interrupters	—	—
July 29, 2021	Houston	United States	Minute Maid Park	The Interrupters	—	—
July 31, 2021	Jacksonville	United States	TIAA Bank Field	The Interrupters	—	—
August 1, 2021	Miami Gardens	United States	Hard Rock Stadium	The Interrupters	—	—
August 4, 2021 (Note: Fall Out Boy was scheduled to perform, but cancelled their appearance due to a positive COVID test in their party)	New York City	United States	Citi Field	The Interrupters	—	—
August 5, 2021	Boston	United States	Fenway Park	The Interrupters	—	—
August 8, 2021	Washington, D.C.	United States	Nationals Park	The Interrupters	—	—
August 10, 2021	Detroit	United States	Comerica Park	The Interrupters	—	—
August 13, 2021	Hershey	United States	Hersheypark Stadium	The Interrupters	—	—
August 15, 2021	Chicago	United States	Wrigley Field	The Interrupters	—	—
August 17, 2021	Columbus	United States	Historic Crew Stadium	The Interrupters	—	—
August 19, 2021	Pittsburgh	United States	PNC Park	The Interrupters	—	—
August 20, 2021	Philadelphia	United States	Citizens Bank Park	The Interrupters	—	—
August 23, 2021	Minneapolis	United States	Target Field	The Interrupters	—	—
August 25, 2021	Commerce City	United States	Dick's Sporting Goods Park	The Interrupters	—	—
August 27, 2021	San Francisco	United States	Oracle Park	The Interrupters	—	—
August 29, 2021	San Diego	United States	Petco Park	The Interrupters	—	—
September 1, 2021 (Note: Part of Summerfest 2022.)	Milwaukee	United States	American Family Insurance Amphitheater	KennyHoopla	—	—
September 3, 2021	Los Angeles	United States	Dodger Stadium	The Interrupters	—	—
September 6, 2021	Seattle	United States	T-Mobile Park	The Interrupters	—	—

List of 2022 concerts showing date, city, country, venue, opening act, attendance, and revenue
Date	City	Country	Venue	Opening Acts	Attendance	Revenue
June 19, 2022	Vienna	Austria	Ernst-Happel-Stadion	Amyl and The Sniffers	—	—
June 21, 2022	Antwerp	Belgium	Sportpaleis	Amyl and The Sniffers	—	—
June 22, 2022	Groningen	Netherlands	Stadspark	Amyl and The Sniffers	—	—
June 24, 2022	London	England	London Stadium	Amyl and The Sniffers	—	—
June 25, 2022	Huddersfield	England	John Smith's Stadium	Amyl and The Sniffers	—	—
June 27, 2022	Dublin	Ireland	Marlay Park	Amyl and The Sniffers	—	—
June 29, 2022	Glasgow	Scotland	Bellahouston Park	Amyl and The Sniffers	—	—
July 2, 2022	Paris	France	Paris La Défense Arena	Amyl and The Sniffers	—	—
Total					—	—

== Cancelled shows ==
Date	City	Country	Venue	Reason
November 8, 2020	Perth	Australia	Perth Oval	COVID-19 pandemic
November 11, 2020	Melbourne	Australia	Marvel Stadium	COVID-19 pandemic
November 14, 2020	Sydney	Australia	Western Sydney Stadium	COVID-19 pandemic
November 17, 2020	Brisbane	Australia	Lang Park	COVID-19 pandemic
November 20, 2020	Dunedin	New Zealand	Forsyth Barr Stadium	COVID-19 pandemic
November 22, 2020	Auckland	New Zealand	Mount Smart Stadium	COVID-19 pandemic
August 17, 2021 (Note: Originally scheduled for August 24, 2020.)	Toronto	Canada	Rogers Centre	COVID-19 pandemic

== Personnel ==
=== Weezer ===
- Rivers Cuomo – lead vocals, guitar, drum solo on "Africa"
- Brian Bell – guitar, backing vocals, keyboards
- Scott Shriner – bass, backing vocals, synthesizers
- Patrick Wilson – drums

Additional musician

- Dave Eltich – drums (filled in for Wilson in the European leg of the tour)

=== Fall Out Boy ===
- Patrick Stump – lead vocals, guitar, piano
- Joe Trohman – guitar, backing vocals
- Pete Wentz – bass guitar, backing vocals
- Andy Hurley – drums, percussion, backing vocals

=== Green Day ===
- Billie Joe Armstrong – lead vocals, guitar, harmonica
- Mike Dirnt – bass guitar, backing vocals
- Tré Cool – drums, percussion, backing vocals

Additional musicians

- Jason White – guitar, backing vocals
- Jason Freese – keyboards, piano, saxophone, accordion, backing vocals
- Kevin Tyler Preston – guitar, backing vocals

== Promotional performances ==
Green Day, Fall Out Boy and Weezer arranged performances to promote the tour as follows:

- September 10, 2019 – All three bands played at a tour announcement show at the Whisky a Go Go in West Hollywood, California, United States
- September 11, 2019 – Weezer at Jimmy Kimmel Live! at the El Capitan Entertainment Centre in Los Angeles, United States
- September 11, 2019 – Fall Out Boy at Jimmy Kimmel Live! at the El Capitan Entertainment Centre in Los Angeles, United States
- September 12, 2019 – Green Day at Jimmy Kimmel Live! at the El Capitan Entertainment Centre in Los Angeles, United States
- September 20, 2019 – Green Day at the iHeartRadio Music Festival at T-Mobile Arena in Paradise, Nevada, United States
- October 9, 2019 – Green Day at The Howard Stern Show at SiriusXM Hollywood in Los Angeles, United States
- October 25, 2019 – Green Day at Kevin and Bean at the HD Radio Sound Space at Live House Hollywood in Los Angeles, United States
- October 30, 2019 – Green Day at La Riviera in Madrid, Spain
- November 2, 2019 – Green Day at the 2019 MTV Europe Music Awards World Stage at the Plaza de España in Seville, Spain
- November 11, 2019 – Fall Out Boy at The Showbox in Seattle
- November 24, 2019 – Green Day at the American Music Awards of 2019 at the Microsoft Theater in Los Angeles, United States
- December 12, 2019 – Green Day at The Game Awards 2019 at the Microsoft Theater in Los Angeles, United States
- December 31, 2019 – Green Day at Dick Clark's New Year's Rockin' Eve in Hollywood, California, United States
- January 25, 2020 – Green Day played two performances for the 2020 National Hockey League All-Star Game, both outside and inside the Enterprise Center in St. Louis, United States
- February 6, 2020 – Green Day at The Ellen DeGeneres Show at Warner Bros. Studios in Burbank, California, United States
- February 7, 2020 – Green Day at the iHeartRadio Theater Los Angeles in Burbank, California, United States
- February 10, 2020 – Green Day at Good Morning America at the El Capitan Entertainment Centre in Hollywood, California, United States
- February 10, 2020 – Green Day at The Late Late Show with James Corden at CBS Television City in Los Angeles, United States
- June 17, 2020 – Weezer at The Tonight Show Starring Jimmy Fallon
- February 6, 2021 – Green Day at the 10th NFL Honors at SoFi Stadium in Inglewood, California, United States
- May 7, 2021 – Weezer at the iHeartRadio Theater Los Angeles
- May 10, 2021 – Weezer at The Tonight Show Starring Jimmy Fallon
- June 23, 2021 – Weezer at Late Night with Seth Meyers
- July 16, 2021 – Weezer and Fall Out Boy at Good Morning America
- July 20, 2021 – Green Day at Cain's Ballroom in Tulsa, Oklahoma, United States
