= I've Been Waiting =

2019 single by Lil Peep and iLoveMakonnen featuring Fall Out Boy

Single by Lil Peep and iLoveMakonnen featuring Fall Out Boy

from the album Greatest Hits: Believers Never Die – Volume Two
- Released: January 31, 2019
- Recorded: August 2017
- Genre: Pop
- Length: 3:54
- Label: Autnmy; Columbia
- Songwriters: Louis Bell; Makonnen Sheran; Gustav Åhr; Andrew Hurley; Brenton Duvall; Joseph Trohman; Valentin Leon Blavatnik; Patrick Stump; Brian Lee; Peter Wentz
- Producers: IIVI; Brian Lee; Louis Bell; iLoveMakonnen; Brenton Duvall

Lil Peep singles chronology
"Life Is Beautiful" (2018)	"I've Been Waiting" (2019)	"Star Shopping" (2019)

iLoveMakonnen singles chronology
"Spendin'" (2019)	"I've Been Waiting" (2019)	"Drunk on Saturday" (2019)

Fall Out Boy singles chronology
"City in a Garden" (2018)	"I've Been Waiting" (2019)	"Dear Future Self (Hands Up)" (2019)

Music video
- "I've Been Waiting" on YouTube

"I've Been Waiting" is a song by American rappers Lil Peep and iLoveMakonnen featuring American rock band Fall Out Boy. It was released on January 31, 2019, through Columbia Records. It peaked at number sixty-two on the US Billboard Hot 100 chart, becoming Lil Peep's second highest-charting song. It was certified Gold by the Recording Industry of America (RIAA), becoming his second Gold certification.

== Background ==
According to iLoveMakonnen, the song was from an album called Diamonds that he had worked on with Lil Peep before his death. It began as a demo from iLoveMakonnen that Lil Peep was introduced to in July 2017 and liked.

After Lil Peep's death in November 2017, Pete Wentz from Fall Out Boy reached out to iLoveMakonnen, offering condolences. iLoveMakonnen told Wentz that both he and Lil Peep were fans of Fall Out Boy, leading the band to collaborate on the song, which iLoveMakonnen felt was the best fit for them. He solicited help from more songwriters and record producers to complete the song.

The original version of the song without Fall Out Boy was included on the Everybody's Everything compilation album and Diamonds.

== Reception ==
Ton Sheperd of Kerrang! described the song as an "out-and-out pop jam", while praising Lil Peep's performance.

== Charts ==
Chart (2019)	Peak position
Czech Republic Airplay (ČNS IFPI)	12
Czech Republic Singles Digital (ČNS IFPI)	82
New Zealand Hot Singles (RMNZ)	12
Poland Airplay (ZPAV)	38
Sweden Heatseeker (Sverigetopplistan)	13
US Billboard Hot 100	62
US Adult Pop Airplay (Billboard)	14
US Pop Airplay (Billboard)	15
US Dance/Mix Show Airplay (Billboard)	25

== Certifications ==
Region	Certification	Certified units/sales
Mexico (AMPROFON)	Gold	30,000^{‡}
Poland (ZPAV)	Gold	10,000^{‡}
United States (RIAA)	Platinum	1,000,000^{‡}
^{‡} Sales+streaming figures based on certification alone.
