= Hold Me Tight or Don't =

- Remix single

Single by Fall Out Boy

from the album Mania
- Released: November 15, 2017
- Genre: Tropical house; reggae; Europop
- Length: 3:30
- Label: Island; DCD2
- Songwriters: Pete Wentz; Patrick Stump; Joe Trohman; Andy Hurley; Jonny Coffer; Taylor Upsahl
- Producers: Coffer; Butch Walker; Fall Out Boy

Fall Out Boy singles chronology
"The Last of the Real Ones" (2017)	"Hold Me Tight or Don't" (2017)	"Wilson (Expensive Mistakes)" (2018)

Music video
- "Hold Me Tight or Don't" on YouTube

"Hold Me Tight or Don't" (stylised in all caps) is a song by American rock band Fall Out Boy, released on November 15, 2017, through Island Records and DCD2. It was released as the fourth single from their seventh studio album, Mania. A music video was released with the single.

"Hold Me Tight or Don't (The Remixes)" was released on April 13, 2018, featuring three remixes of the song.

== Composition ==
"Hold Me Tight or Don't" was written in the key of C# minor with a vocal range of E4 to C♯6.

Al Shipley of Spin called the song "trendy trop house", while also comparing it to reggae. Dave Simpson of The Guardian described the song as a "Shakira-type Europop wobbler". The Musical Hype has described the song, particularly the lyrical content, as emo.

== Music video ==
The music video was directed by Brendan Walter and Mel Soria. It is set on Día de Muertos and features the band performing in the festival. The video also has a romantic subplot between a woman, dressed in traditional Day of the Dead costume, and a man wearing a skull mask. The San Gabriel Mission Museum is visible in the background, implying the video was filmed in San Gabriel, California.

== Reception ==
Maeve McDermott of USA Today called the song a "lazy attempt" at tropical house music, while Hannah Mylrea of NME felt that it is a "chiming tropical jam".

== Track listing ==
All tracks are written by Patrick Stump, Joe Trohman, Pete Wentz, Andy Hurley, and Jonny Coffer.

Digital download
No.	Title	Length
1.	"Hold Me Tight or Don't"	3:30

Digital download (remixes)
No.	Title	Length
1.	"Hold Me Tight or Don't" (Sweater Beats remix)	2:59
2.	"Hold Me Tight or Don't" (The White Panda remix)	2:40
3.	"Hold Me Tight or Don't" (VALNTN remix)	3:17
Total length:		8:54

Spotify Singles (Recorded at Spotify Studios NYC)
No.	Title	Length
1.	"Hold Me Tight or Don't" (acoustic)	3:21
2.	"I Wanna Dance with Somebody (Who Loves Me)" (Whitney Houston cover)	4:22

== Personnel ==
Fall Out Boy

- Patrick Stump – vocals, rhythm guitar, keyboards, percussion, songwriting, production, engineering
- Pete Wentz – bass guitar, songwriting, production
- Joe Trohman – lead guitar, keyboards, songwriting, programming, production, engineering
- Andy Hurley – drums, percussion, songwriting, production

Production

- Jonny Coffer - programming, keyboards, songwriting
- Butch Walker - engineering
- Todd Stopera - engineering
- Mark "Spike" Stent - mixing engineer

== Charts ==
=== Weekly charts ===
Weekly chart performance for "Hold Me Tight or Don't"
Chart (2017–2018)	Peak position
UK Singles (Official Charts)	99
US Adult Pop Airplay (Billboard)	25
US Hot Rock & Alternative Songs (Billboard)	7
US Pop Airplay (Billboard)	32

=== Year-end charts ===
Year-end chart performance for "Hold Me Tight or Don't
Chart (2018)	Position
US Hot Rock Songs (Billboard)	29

== Certifications ==
Region	Certification	Certified units/sales
United States (RIAA)	Gold	500,000^{‡}
^{‡} Sales+streaming figures based on certification alone.

== Release history ==
Release dates and formats for "Hold Me Tight or Don't"
Region	Date	Format	Ref.
United States	November 15, 2017	Digital download	
United States	November 21, 2017	Alternative radio	
United States	November 21, 2017	Top 40 radio	
United States	April 13, 2018	Digital download (remixes)	
