= Llamania =

EP by Frosty and the Nightmare Making Machine (Fall Out Boy)
- Released: February 23, 2018
- Recorded: 2016–2017
- Length: 3:47
- Label: M A N I A Corp.
- Producer: Stay Frosty & Royal Tea

Frosty and the Nightmare Making Machine (Fall Out Boy) chronology
| Mania (2018) | Llamania (2018) | Lake Effect Kid (2018) |

Llamania is an exclusive three-track extended play (EP) by fictional musical group Frosty and the Nightmare Making Machine, released on February 23, 2018, by Mania Corp. The fictitious band consists of the fictional members Frosty and Royal Tea, created by American rock band Fall Out Boy. The EP contains three unfinished demos from the recording sessions of the band's seventh studio album, Mania (2018). The Llamas were designed by New York based Furry Puppet Studio.

== Background ==
Fall Out Boy released their seventh full-length studio album, Mania, on January 19, 2018, through Island Records as a follow-up to their sixth studio album American Beauty/American Psycho (2015). Prior to the release of Mania, members of Fall Out Boy hinted at releasing unreleased demo tracks from the recording sessions of Mania under the fictitious band name Frosty & The Nightmare Making Machine. On February 23, it was revealed that the band would release the extended play (EP) Llamania with three unfinished demo recordings.

The band's bassist and lyricist Pete Wentz stated on Twitter involving Llamania:

When we pushed the record back- we felt like we wanted to thank everybody for being patient. So these are three demos we scrapped that will never be finished...

== Promotion ==
Prior to the release of Mania, Fall Out Boy used the website www.themaniacorp.com to promote the album with cryptic, mysterious messages, gifs, and phrases. The website featured lyrics from songs off of Mania and alluded that the llamas Frosty and Royal Tea were to form the fictitious band Frosty & The Nightmare Making Machines.

== Track listing ==
All songs written, recorded, and credited to Frosty & Royal Tea.

| No. | Title | Length |
|---|---|---|
| 1. | "Past Life" | 0:55 |
| 2. | "Footprints in the Snow" | 1:15 |
| 3. | "Wrong Side of Paradise" | 1:37 |
| Total length: | | 3:47 |

=== Notes ===
- In the liner notes, the credits state "All rights reserved, unauthorized duplication is highly encouraged."
- The liner notes state the EP was produced and mixed entirely by Frosty & Royal Tea.
- The cover alludes to the album cover art for Fall Out Boy's debut studio album, Take This to Your Grave (2003).
