= Dear Future Self (Hands Up) =

Single by Fall Out Boy featuring Wyclef Jean

from the album Greatest Hits: Believers Never Die – Volume Two
- Released: September 10, 2019
- Recorded: 2019
- Studio: Nervous Breakdance Studios (Studio City, California); The Rate Cave and the Rib Cage (Los Angeles, California)
- Genre: Pop-punk; dancehall; pop
- Length: 2:51
- Label: Island; DCD2
- Songwriters: Andy Hurley; Pete Wentz; Patrick Stump; Joe Trohman; Wyclef Jean; Jens Siverstedt; Jonas Wallin; Noonie Bao
- Producers: Wyclef Jean; Jens Siverstedt; Patrick Stump; Suzy Shinn (co.)

Fall Out Boy singles chronology
"I've Been Waiting" (2019)	"Dear Future Self (Hands Up)" (2019)	"Bob Dylan" (2019)

Wyclef Jean singles chronology
"Mystery" (2018)	"Dear Future Self (Hands Up)" (2019)

Music video
- "Dear Future Self (Hands Up)" on YouTube

"Dear Future Self (Hands Up)" is a song by American rock band Fall Out Boy featuring Haitian rapper Wyclef Jean. It was released on September 10, 2019, on DCD2 and Island Records as a single from their compilation album, Greatest Hits: Believers Never Die – Volume Two.

== Background ==
In October 2009, Fall Out Boy announced their first greatest hits album, Believers Never Die – Greatest Hits. The compilation album was released on November 17, 2009. Nearly ten years after the release of the album, the band announced Believers Never Die Volume Two – Greatest Hits, with a scheduled release date of November 15, 2019. The announcement coincided with the Hella Mega Tour announcement, a concert tour that took place from July 2021 to July 2022 with American rock bands Green Day and Weezer, in Europe and the United States.

== Composition ==
"Dear Future Self (Hands Up)" was written by Fall Out Boy, Wyclef Jean, Jens Siverstedt, Jonas Wallin, and Noonie Bao. The chorus samples "Hands Up" by Inna. The track has a runtime of 2 minutes and 51 seconds. In an interview with Zane Lowe on Apple Music's radio station Beats 1, Pete Wentz spoke about the composition of the song:

I think we've always been big fans of Fugees and Wyclef. He's got an incredible sense of melody that's kind of out there. It's like you can tell it's a mix from all over kind of the globe, which is cool, and super inspired by seeing my kids and that they just listen to song, to song, to song, to song and it's going from Queen to Lil Uzi to you know...

Aaron Grech of MXDWN described the song as blending "elements of Fall Out Boy's pop punk style, mixed in with eclectic dance hall inspired rhythms", while overall labeling "Dear Future Self (Hands Up)" as a "summer pop song".

== Credits and personnel ==
Fall Out Boy

- Patrick Stump – lead vocals, rhythm guitar, programming, production, composing
- Pete Wentz – bass guitar, composing, backing vocals
- Joe Trohman – lead guitar, composing, backing vocals
- Andy Hurley – drums, percussion, composing, backing vocals

Additional personnel

- Wyclef Jean – featured artist, composing, production, lead vocals
- Suzy Shinn – co-producer, recording engineer, backing vocals
- Jens Siverstedt – production, composing
- Wesley Seidman – recording engineer
- Mark "Spike" Stent – mixing engineer
- Michael Freeman – assistant engineer
- Noonie Bao – backing vocals, composing
- Randy Merrill – mastering engineer

== Charts ==
=== Weekly charts ===
Chart (2019)	Peak position
US Hot Rock & Alternative Songs (Billboard)	13
US Rock & Alternative Airplay (Billboard)	16

=== Year-end charts ===
Chart (2019)	Position
US Hot Rock Songs (Billboard)	100
