= Young and Menace =

Single by Fall Out Boy

from the album Mania
- Released: April 27, 2017
- Genre: Industrial; EDM; electronic rock
- Length: 3:44
- Label: Island; DCD2
- Songwriters: Pete Wentz; Patrick Stump; Joe Trohman; Andy Hurley
- Producers: Fall Out Boy; Jesse Shatkin

Fall Out Boy singles chronology
"Ghostbusters (I'm Not Afraid)" (2016)	"Young and Menace" (2017)	"Champion" (2017)

Music video
- "Young and Menace" on YouTube

"Young and Menace" is a song by American rock band Fall Out Boy, released on April 27, 2017, through Island Records and DCD2. It was released as the lead single from the band's seventh studio album, Mania. The music video was released simultaneously with the single.

== Background ==
In deciding what "Young and Menace" would sound like, Pete Wentz took inspiration from artists he admires like the Clash, David Bowie, and Kanye West whose musical direction evolved over time. Wentz told Andrew Trendell of NME that the original version of the song was so "extreme" and "chaotic" that "It sounded like a 1990's modem. It didn't even sound like music. So we reigned [sic] it in from there." The band felt that the track might not be radio-friendly, but that it could resonate with the wider culture.

Initially, the song made a reference to the personal life of Britney Spears, and included the lyric "Oops I did it again/ I’ve got my head shaved and my umbrella out/ I just forgot what I was talking about." Wentz removed the references to Spears' personal struggles, as he was not comfortable discussing them in his music. The finished song still name-drops Spears' single "Oops!... I Did It Again" (2000). Wentz told Nylon's Ilana Kaplan that he referenced Spears in "Young and Menace" because "To me, Britney Spears is a mirror we hold up to pop culture: We build her up, tear her down, root for her or against her. I think it says so much more about us as a culture than it does about Britney herself."

== Composition ==
Andrew Trendell of NME described "Young and Menace" as an industrial and EDM song, in contrast to the pop-punk and pop rock sound of the band’s previous album, American Beauty/American Psycho. Anna Gaca of Spin described the song as bringing together "EDM drops" and "heavy metal bombast". Britney Stapos of Rolling Stone described it as "harsh electro-rock".

== Music video ==
The music video for "Young and Menace" premiered on April 27, 2017 on Fall Out Boy's official Vevo and YouTube channels. A trailer ran for it briefly in select Chicago theatres on April 21, 2017.

The music video features a young biracial child suffering through domestic violence within their household. The child's parents are dressed as llama/alpaca puppet "monsters". Wentz has stated "The concept of the video is realizing that your place in the world is maybe not just what you thought it was growing up. I grew up as a weird kid in a place where I felt like I didn't fit it. It wasn't until punk/rock and stuff where I felt like I found other people [who] similarly didn't fit in." The llama puppets were designed and developed for the music video by New York based Furry Puppet Studio.

== Personnel ==
Fall Out Boy

- Patrick Stump – lead vocals, guitar, programming, songwriting, primary production
- Pete Wentz – bass guitar, songwriting, primary production
- Joe Trohman – lead guitar, songwriting, primary production
- Andy Hurley – drums, percussion, songwriting, primary production

Additional personnel

- Jesse Shatkin – production, mixing
- Suzy Shinn – engineering
- Rouble Kapoor – assistant engineering

== Charts ==
=== Weekly charts ===
Weekly chart performance for "Young and Menace"
Chart (2017)	Peak position
Australia (ARIA)	97
New Zealand Heatseekers (RMNZ)	6
Scottish Singles Sales (Official Charts)	35
UK Singles (Official Charts)	67
US Bubbling Under Hot 100 (Billboard)	2
US Hot Rock & Alternative Songs (Billboard)	7

=== Year-end charts ===
Year-end chart performance for "Young and Menace"
Chart (2017)	Position
US Hot Rock Songs (Billboard)	97

== Certifications ==
Region	Certification	Certified units/sales
United States (RIAA)	Gold	500,000^{‡}
^{‡} Sales+streaming figures based on certification alone.
