= Champion (Fall Out Boy song) =

Single by Fall Out Boy

from the album Mania
- Released: June 22, 2017
- Genre: Pop; pop rock; pop-punk; hip hop
- Length: 3:12
- Label: Island; DCD2
- Songwriters: Pete Wentz; Patrick Stump; Joe Trohman; Andy Hurley; Sia Furler
- Producers: Fall Out Boy; Jesse Shatkin

Fall Out Boy singles chronology
"Young and Menace" (2017)	"Champion" (2017)	"The Last of the Real Ones" (2017)

Music video
- "Champion (Visualizer)" on YouTube "Champion (Official Video)" on YouTube

"Champion" is a song by American rock band Fall Out Boy, released on June 22, 2017 in the US and on June 23 worldwide through Island Records and DCD2. It was released as the second single from their seventh studio album, Mania.

== Background ==
While Fall Out Boy's previous single, "Young and Menace", was considered to be a major departure from their usual sound, "Champion" brought back some familiar elements from their more recent albums while still experimenting with new ideas. It was co-written with pop singer-songwriter Sia.

== Composition ==
Musically, "Champion" has been described as a pop, pop rock, pop-punk and hip hop song.

Wentz made a post on his personal Instagram regarding the meaning of the song: "This one really reminds me of this moment in "the never-ending story" . . . first they're like "wait you're just a kid lol we need a [real] warrior" then they're like "ok . . . i guess you'll do" and then "no one can help you and if you don't do this our entire world dies, so no pressure" . . . No one believes but at the same time we all need to believe in you." Another of his notes was posted to Fall Out Boy's Twitter: "In my head champions aren't born, they are forged . . ." In the chorus, Stump repeats the phrase "If I can live through this, I can do anything," which further connects the themes of empowerment and inspiration to the song.

== Promotion ==
=== TV performances ===
The band first performed the song live on Late Night with Seth Meyers on July 26, 2017, to promote the album.

=== Remix ===
At midnight on December 15, 2017, a remix featuring South Korean rapper RM of BTS was released worldwide across all major music streaming sites. Billboard praised the collaboration, saying "...the remix offers up a grittier, hip-hop vibe thanks to a mellow tonal shift and RM’s evocative raps about the hardships of life. Like the original, the remix contains an inspirational, empowering message -- something Fall Out Boy and BTS both often incorporate into their music." FUSE described the new sound as "going from rocking anthem to something of an electronic-pop burner", while Bustle said the revamped track "keeps Fall Out Boy's pop rock melodies intact, but weaves in some hip-hop flair with a guest verse from RM". The remix debuted at number 18 on Billboard's Bubbling Under Hot 100 chart for the issue dated January 6, 2018. It also landed on the Rock Digital Song Sales chart, peaking at number two for the week of January 3, 2018, and beating the band's previous peak position of number four with the original version.

=== Appearances in other media ===
The song is featured in the soundtrack of WWE 2K19. It was selected by Alexa Bliss to appear in the game's soundtrack.

== Music video ==
The visualizer for "Champion" debuted on Fall Out Boy's official Vevo and YouTube channels. It featured Wentz and rapper Post Malone skateboarding in a warehouse, along with the llamas that were seen in the music video for "Young and Menace". The band released it as an interim video, with plans to put the music video out at a later date.

The official music video was released on July 28, 2017 also through Vevo and YouTube. The video observed people chasing their dreams and experiencing the world through VR headsets. American actor and rapper Jaden Smith ended the video by destroying the headset with a baseball bat. A note written by Wentz was posted to Fall Out Boy's official Twitter account along with a link to the video: "I can't think of a drug worse than fake reality . . . . Smash the fake reality. Don't just sit around and kill time." The concept of "fake reality" is represented by the VR headsets, while the last sentence alludes to the song's lyrics. Actor Josh Brener, The Bachelor star Ashley Iaconetti, and actor Timothy Granaderos also made appearances. The video was nominated for Best Rock Video in the 2018 Video Music Awards.

== Track listing ==
All tracks are written by Patrick Stump, Andy Hurley, Jesse Shatkin, Sia Furler, Joe Trohman, and Pete Wentz.

Digital download (remix)
No.	Title	Length
1.	"Champion" (Remix featuring RM of BTS)	3:30

== Personnel ==
Adapted from the liner notes of Mania.

Fall Out Boy

- Patrick Stump – lead vocals, guitar, keyboard, programming, songwriting, production
- Pete Wentz – bass guitar, backing vocals, songwriting, production
- Joe Trohman – lead guitar, backing vocals, keyboard, songwriting, production
- Andy Hurley – drums, percussion, songwriting, production

Production

- Jesse Shatkin – programming, keyboards
- Mark "Spike" Stent – mixing
- Suzy Shinn – assistant recording
- Jay Ruston – assistant recording
- Sam Dent – engineering
- Sia Furler – songwriting

== Charts ==
=== Weekly charts ===
Weekly chart performance for "Champion"
Chart (2017–2018)	Peak position
Hungary (Single Top 40)	30
New Zealand Heatseekers (RMNZ)	9
US Bubbling Under Hot 100 (Billboard) Remix	18
US Adult Pop Airplay (Billboard)	39
US Hot Rock & Alternative Songs (Billboard)	10
US Rock & Alternative Airplay (Billboard)	31

=== Year-end charts ===
Year-end chart performance for "Champion"
Chart (2017)	Position
US Hot Rock Songs (Billboard)	74

== Certifications ==
Certifications for "Champion"
Region	Certification	Certified units/sales
United States (RIAA)	Gold	500,000^{‡}
^{‡} Sales+streaming figures based on certification alone.
