= Mania (Fall Out Boy album) =

Studio album by Fall Out Boy
- Released: January 19, 2018
- Recorded: 2016–2017
- Studios: Sound City; Sunset Sound; Electro-Vox; Nervous Breakdance; United; The Rat Cave; Serenity West; The Rib Cage
- Genres: Pop rock; electronic rock; electropop
- Length: 35:46
- Labels: Island; DCD2
- Producers: Jonny Coffer; Fall Out Boy; D. Sardy; Jesse Shatkin; Butch Walker

Fall Out Boy chronology
Make America Psycho Again (2015)	Mania (2018)	Llamania (2018)

Singles from Mania
- 1. "Young and Menace" Released: April 27, 2017; 2. "Champion" Released: June 22, 2017; 3. "The Last of the Real Ones" Released: September 14, 2017; 4. "Hold Me Tight or Don't" Released: November 15, 2017; 5. "Wilson (Expensive Mistakes)" Released: January 11, 2018

Mania (stylized as M A N I A) is the seventh studio album by American rock band Fall Out Boy, released on January 19, 2018, through Island Records and DCD2. The album was produced by Jonny Coffer, D. Sardy, Jesse Shatkin, and longtime collaborator Butch Walker, as well as self-production from the band. The album was preceded by five singles; "Young and Menace", "Champion", "The Last of the Real Ones", "Hold Me Tight or Don't", and "Wilson (Expensive Mistakes)".

Originally announced for release on September 15, 2017, Mania was delayed to the following January. Upon release, it received largely mixed reviews from music critics, but fared well commercially, becoming their third consecutive album to debut at number one on the US Billboard 200. However, it is the band's first album since their debut, Take This to Your Grave (2003), not to produce a Billboard Hot 100 single on the chart. In 2019, it was nominated for Best Rock Album at the 61st Annual Grammy Awards.

== Background ==
Fall Out Boy enjoyed commercial success and worldwide acclaim after releasing their sixth studio album, American Beauty/American Psycho (2015). During the extensive touring in support of the album, the group began writing and recording material for a seventh album. The beginning of the production process for Mania began after the band's frontman Patrick Stump introduced the song "Young and Menace" to bass guitarist Pete Wentz at Reading and Leeds Festival in 2016, which inspired the musicians to record a full-length. In an interview with Rolling Stone, Wentz described the vision behind Mania. "It feels like every once in awhile, you've gotta do a hard restart that clears the cache and erases the hard drive. I think that's what [Mania] was – a big palette cleanse," said Wentz.

After the release of the album's first two singles, "Young and Menace" and "Champion", Patrick Stump issued a statement on Twitter confirming that the band was postponing the release date for Mania until January 19, 2018, due to the album "feeling rushed."

=== Album delay ===
Mania was originally scheduled for a release on September 15, 2017, worldwide. However, on August 3, 2017, Patrick Stump announced that the record would be pushed back until January 19, 2018. "The album just really isn't ready, and it felt very rushed," Stump said on Twitter. "I'm never going to put a record out I genuinely don't believe is at least as strong or valid as the one that came before it and in order to do that we need a little bit more time to properly and carefully record solid performances."

On November 6, 2017, the band announced on social media that the album had been completed and revealed the tracklist. In the lead up to the album's release, it became evident that several streaming platforms had published the tracks of the album out of order. The physical copies retain the order originally released by the band.

== Composition ==
The album sees the group further departing from a pop-punk and alternative rock sound and having a more "experimental" approach to their newfound sound, incorporating pop rock, electronic rock, and electropop.

== Promotion ==
In support of the album, the band performed the singles on television and embarked on the Mania Tour in October 2017. The tour, which took place in both North America, Australia and New Zealand, featured support from blackbear, Jaden Smith, and Waax. The song "Wilson (Expensive Mistakes)", was debuted live on October 20, 2017, as part of the Mania Tour's setlist.

=== The M A N I A Experience ===
To promote their upcoming headlining gig at Wrigley Field, Mania, and their then-just-released EP, Lake Effect Kid, the band held a pop-up event in Chicago, IL titled "The M A N I A Experience". The MANIA Experience, according to the band, was the analog to the album. It featured many rooms named after songs from the record, including "Wilson," a dimly-lit jungle with the lyrics "I'll stop wearing black when they make a darker color" on the wall; "Sunshine Riptide," which featured a ball pit with pills and pill bottles with the FOB logo on them, and had "The pills are kicking in" on the wall; Room three was titled "Give Me a Boost", taken from their song "Heaven's Gate." This room was unique as it had headphones for fans to listen to unreleased tracks and remixes, including one version of a song sung by Rivers Cuomo of Weezer. Each set of headphones had a different song that fans could listen to. The room also featured warped mirrors on the wall, as well as spinning faceless ballerinas and a broken music box with the lyrics "One look from you and I'm on that faded love out of my body, and I'm flying up above." The washroom in the facility was also FOB-themed and had posters for their album as well as strands of yarn on the mirrors for fans to take a picture with, a homage to the artwork for their EP Lake Effect Kid. Room four was "Young and Menace"-themed, and was upside-down. Fans also had the opportunity to listen to music with headphones while feeling upside down. Room five was "Church"-themed, and had gothic themed curtains surrounding a coffin. The coffin was a mirror that had the effect of making it look endless. Room six was in the theme of "Hold Me Tight or Don't", with loads of teddybears of various sizes. There was also a room in which Pete Wentz, as well as Andy Hurley, would be in a box writing with headphones on with a sign that read: "Don't Tap on The Glass," which is a reference to their song "Sunshine Riptide." This room also referenced "Church" where fans could write on the wall "confessing their sins."

== Singles ==
The lead single, "Young and Menace", was released on April 27, 2017, alongside its music video. The song has a notable influence from the EDM genre, hinting at another progression of the band's sound with the album. The second single, "Champion", was released on June 22 in the U.S. and on June 23 worldwide with the "visualizer" music video. On July 27, the official music video was released for the song. The third single, "The Last of the Real Ones", was released on September 14, 2017. The fourth single, "Hold Me Tight or Don't", was released on November 15 with its music video, which takes a notable influence from the Mexican holiday Day Of The Dead. "Wilson (Expensive Mistakes)" was released as the fifth single, accompanied with its music video premiere on January 11, 2018. A music video for "Church" was released along with the album on January 19, 2018. On July 23, 2018, a music video for "Bishops Knife Trick" was released.

=== Llamania EP ===
During recording sessions for Mania, the band scrapped three unfinished tracks; "Past Life", "Wrong Side of Paradise", and "Footprints in the Snow". The tracks were released by Fall Out Boy, under the alias Frosty & The Nightmare Making Machines, in the form of an extended play (EP), entitled Llamania, on February 23, 2018, through physical CD.

== Critical reception ==
Professional ratings
Aggregate scores
Source	Rating
AnyDecentMusic?	4.9/10
Metacritic	59/100
Review scores
Source	Rating
AllMusic	2.5/5 stars
The A.V. Club	C
The Guardian	3/5 stars
Kerrang!	4/5
The New Zealand Herald	3/5 stars
NME	3/5 stars
The Philadelphia Inquirer	3/4 stars
Rock Sound	8/10
Rolling Stone	3/5 stars
The Times	2/5 stars

Mania received mixed reviews from music critics. At Metacritic, which assigns a normalized rating out of 100 to reviews from mainstream critics, the album has an average score of 59 based on 12 reviews, indicating "mixed or average reviews". Fan opinions were much more negative than critical consensus.

In a more positive review, writer Rick Vagabond stated "'MANIA' is an eclectic mess of tracks, but that's the point. It's the manic thoughts of an individual experiencing life. While it really feels like a departure for the band, it does feel as if they are trying something different for themselves and really pouring everything they can into it."

When asked about the album and the fanbase's negative reaction to it in 2023, Pete Wentz said "I feel like our thoughts on 'MANIA' were taken a little out of context. Two records before, we were making albums in a landscape that was not particularly friendly to bands, and so we were just trying to figure out how to survive. It was like The Last of Us: The Pop Radio Version, starring Fall Out Boy fighting the zombies that do not want bands existing. I think 'MANIA' was a direct response to all that. There's a frustrated sound on there. I think it's intentionally noisy, semi-intentionally and polarizing."

In his memoir None of this Rocks, guitarist Joe Trohman revealed he wanted little to do with the album and regrets it, stating "I'd say, 'I'm gonna extricate myself from this. This is not what I want to do,'" he recalls. "'When you have some stuff together, give it to me. If you want me to throw some ideas on there or whatever, I'll do it in my recording studio.' And I did that a little bit, but overall, I stayed pretty much out of it, more or less. Mania has some cool ideas and interesting stuff in there. But it didn't work as well, and I can't say I love it."

== Commercial performance ==
Mania debuted at number one on the US Billboard 200 on February 3, 2018, with 130,000 album-equivalent units, of which 117,000 were pure album sales. It is Fall Out Boy's fourth US number-one album. In Nielsen's mid-year music chart for 2018, Mania was the number three rock album in both equivalent units and sales, with 233,000 equivalent units including 162,000 pure sales. As of February 2023, the album has collated a total of 558,000 album-equivalent units in their home country. It has since been certified Gold by the Recording Industry Association of America for half a million units.

== Track listing ==
Upon its initial release to several digital music retailers, the order of the track listing was incorrect. Pete Wentz later confirmed that the track listing on the physical releases was different from the downloadable version.

All tracks are written by Fall Out Boy, except where noted.

No.	Title	Writer(s)	Producer(s)	Length
1.	"Stay Frosty Royal Milk Tea"		Jesse Shatkin; D. Sardy	2:50
2.	"The Last of the Real Ones"	Fall Out Boy; Carlo Montagnese	Butch Walker; Illangelo^{[a]}	3:50
3.	"Hold Me Tight or Don't"	Fall Out Boy; Jonny Coffer; Taylor Upsahl	Coffer; Walker	3:30
4.	"Wilson (Expensive Mistakes)"		D. Sardy	3:36
5.	"Church"	Fall Out Boy; Audra Mae; Kate York; Andrew Wells	Walker; Wells^{[a]}	3:31
6.	"Heaven's Gate"		D. Sardy	3:45
7.	"Champion"	Fall Out Boy; Sia Furler; Shatkin	Fall Out Boy; Shatkin^{[a]}	3:13
8.	"Sunshine Riptide" (featuring Burna Boy)		Walker	3:24
9.	"Young and Menace"		Fall Out Boy; Shatkin	3:44
10.	"Bishops Knife Trick"		Walker	4:23
Total length:				35:46

Downloaded version track listing
No.	Title	Length
1.	"Young and Menace"	3:44
2.	"Champion"	3:12
3.	"Stay Frosty Royal Milk Tea"	2:50
4.	"Hold Me Tight or Don't"	3:30
5.	"The Last of the Real Ones"	3:50
6.	"Wilson (Expensive Mistakes)"	3:36
7.	"Church"	3:31
8.	"Heaven's Gate"	3:45
9.	"Sunshine Riptide" (featuring Burna Boy)	3:24
10.	"Bishops Knife Trick"	4:23
Total length:		35:46

Japanese bonus track
No.	Title	Length
11.	"Champion" (remix) (featuring RM of BTS)	3:30
Total length:		39:16

Japanese bonus DVD
No.	Title	Length
1.	"Young and Menace" (music video)	3:59
2.	"Young and Menace" (making of video)	2:05
3.	"Champion" (music video)	3:41
4.	"Champion" (making of video)	2:00
5.	"The Last of the Real Ones" (music video)	3:50
6.	"Hold Me Tight or Don't" (music video)	3:37
7.	"Hold Me Tight or Don't" (making of video)	2:08
Total length:		20:00

Notes

- ^{^[a]} – additional production
- Additional production and engineering on all songs by Fall Out Boy
- "Hold Me Tight or Don't" is stylized in all caps.

== Personnel ==
Fall Out Boy

- Andy Hurley – drums, percussion, additional production, additional engineering
- Patrick Stump – lead vocals, guitars, keyboards, additional programming, percussion, additional production, additional engineering, additional vocal engineering (all tracks); engineering (track 7)
- Joe Trohman – guitars, lap steel guitar, additional programming, keyboards, additional production, additional engineering, additional guitar engineering (all tracks); engineering (track 7)
- Pete Wentz – bass guitar, art direction, additional production, additional engineering

Additional musicians

- Jesse Shatkin – drum programming, additional programming, synthesizers (track 1); additional drum programming, programming, keyboards (9)
- Jonny Coffer – programming, keyboards (track 3)

Technical

- Chris Gehringer – mastering
- Will Quinnell – mastering
- Neal Avron – mixing (tracks 1, 2, 4, 8, 10)
- Mark "Spike" Stent – mixing (tracks 3, 5, 7)
- D. Sardy – mixing (track 6)
- Jesse Shatkin – mixing, engineering (track 9)
- James Monti – engineering (tracks 1, 4, 6)
- Michael Harris – engineering (track 1)
- Suzy Shinn – engineering (tracks 1, 9), drum engineering (7)
- Butch Walker – engineering (tracks 2, 3, 5, 8, 10)
- Todd Stopera – engineering (tracks 2, 3, 5, 8, 10)
- Cameron Barton – second engineer (tracks 1, 4, 6)
- Samuel Dent – second engineer (track 1), additional engineering (7)
- Jay Ruston – drum engineering (track 7)
- David Anderson – engineering assistance (tracks 1, 4, 6)
- Geoff Neal – engineering assistance (tracks 1, 4, 6)
- Chris Cerullo – engineering assistance (track 1)
- Rouble Kapoor – engineering assistance (track 10), drum engineering assistance (7)
- Michael Peterson – drum engineering assistance (track 7)

Artwork

- Pamela Littky – photography
- Brendan Walter – layout designer
- Jade Ehlers – layout designer
- Kaitlin Sweet – illustrations
- Matt Burnette-Lemon – package production

== Charts ==
=== Weekly charts ===
Chart (2018)	Peak position
Australian Albums (ARIA)	3
Austrian Albums (Ö3 Austria)	6
Belgian Albums (Ultratop Flanders)	11
Belgian Albums (Ultratop Wallonia)	36
Canadian Albums (Billboard)	2
Croatian International Albums (HDU)	29
Czech Albums (ČNS IFPI)	24
Dutch Albums (Album Top 100)	15
Finnish Albums (Suomen virallinen lista)	8
French Albums (SNEP)	50
German Albums (Offizielle Top 100)	5
Irish Albums (IRMA)	12
Italian Albums (FIMI)	37
Japan Hot Albums (Billboard Japan)	14
Japanese Albums (Oricon)	15
Japanese International Albums (Oricon)	1
New Zealand Albums (RMNZ)	6
Norwegian Albums (VG-lista)	20
Polish Albums (ZPAV)	15
Scottish Albums (Official Charts)	3
Slovak Albums (ČNS IFPI)	36
Spanish Albums (Promusicae)	30
Swedish Albums (Sverigetopplistan)	11
Swiss Albums (Schweizer Hitparade)	10
UK Albums (Official Charts)	2
UK Rock & Metal Albums (Official Charts)	1
US Billboard 200	1
US Top Rock Albums (Billboard)	1

=== Year-end charts ===
Chart (2018)	Position
UK Albums (OCC)	94
US Billboard 200	198
US Top Rock Albums (Billboard)	36

== Certifications ==
Certifications for Mania
Region	Certification	Certified units/sales
United Kingdom (BPI)	Gold	100,000^{‡}
United States (RIAA)	Gold	500,000^{‡}
^{‡} Sales+streaming figures based on certification alone.
