= Lake Effect Kid =

EP by Fall Out Boy
- Released: August 23, 2018
- Recorded: 2018
- Genre: Pop rock; pop-punk
- Length: 10:50
- Label: Island; Decaydance
- Producer: Sean O'Keefe; Fall Out Boy

Fall Out Boy chronology
Llamania (2018)	Lake Effect Kid (2018)	Believers Never Die Volume Two – Greatest Hits (2019)

Singles from Lake Effect Kid
- 1. "City in a Garden" Released: August 23, 2018

Lake Effect Kid is the ninth extended play (EP) by American rock band Fall Out Boy, released on August 23, 2018, through Island and DCD2. It is the band's second EP, and third studio release overall, to be released in 2018 following their seventh studio album Mania and eighth EP, Llamania, the latter which was released under the moniker Frosty and the Nightmare Making Machines. The EP is the first release to feature Sean O'Keefe credited as producer since the band's EP, My Heart Will Always Be the B-Side to My Tongue (2004). It consists of one re-recorded track, "Lake Effect Kid", which was originally released on the group's 2008 mixtape Welcome to the New Administration, and two unreleased tracks.

The extended play was supported by a music video for the single "City in a Garden", which was released on August 23, 2018. The band performed "Lake Effect Kid" as part of their Mania Tour. It was the group's final project of new material to be released during the Mania album cycle.

== Background ==
On August 18, 2008, Fall Out Boy launched a viral marketing campaign including the release of a mixtape, entitled Welcome to the New Administration to promote their then-forthcoming fourth studio album, Folie à Deux, released in December 2008. The mixtape consisted of various demo recordings from numerous other musical groups, including a track titled "Lake Effect Kid (Demo)" by Fall Out Boy. In February 2013, the band played the track live for the first time, as part of a medley of a number of other album deep cuts.

On July 5, 2018, the band's bass guitarist and lyricist Pete Wentz hinted that they may release an EP with the title Lake Effect Kid in 2018. On August 22, the group mentioned it again, publishing a tweet confirming that the EP would be released on the same day, stating "Forever a lake effect kid. New EP dropping tonight at midnight ET to celebrate our biggest homecoming yet." The "biggest homecoming yet" refers to Fall Out Boy's headlining concert at Wrigley Field, their first-ever stadium headlining gig, in their hometown of Chicago, Illinois. The EP was released as planned, and included a studio version of the song.

== Promotion ==
On the same day of the EP's release, Fall Out Boy premiered a music video for the song "City in a Garden". The band explained the video as "a glimpse at all the madness throughout the years".

== Track listing ==
All songs written by Fall Out Boy.

No.	Title	Length
1.	"Lake Effect Kid"	3:40
2.	"City in a Garden"	3:25
3.	"Super Fade"	3:45
Total length:		10:50

== Credits and personnel ==
Fall Out Boy

- Patrick Stump – lead vocals, rhythm guitar, keyboards, programming
- Pete Wentz – bass guitar, backing vocals
- Joe Trohman – lead guitar, backing vocals, keyboards, programming
- Andy Hurley – drums, percussion

Production

- Fall Out Boy – producer
- Neal Avron – mixing engineer (on "City in a Garden", "Super Fade")
- Patrick Stump – audio engineer
- Sean O'Keefe – producer (on "Lake Effect Kid")
- Suzy Shinn – audio engineer (on "City in a Garden", "Super Fade")
