= The Last of the Real Ones =

- Remix single

Single by Fall Out Boy

from the album Mania
- Released: September 14, 2017
- Genre: Pop rock; synth-pop; electronic rock
- Length: 3:52
- Label: Island; DCD2
- Songwriters: Patrick Stump; Pete Wentz; Joe Trohman; Andy Hurley; Carlo Montagnese
- Producer: Illangelo

Fall Out Boy singles chronology
"Champion" (2017)	"The Last of the Real Ones" (2017)	"Hold Me Tight or Don't" (2017)

Music video
- "The Last of the Real Ones" on YouTube

"The Last of the Real Ones" is a song by American rock band Fall Out Boy, released on September 14, 2017 in North America and September 15, 2017 worldwide. It was released as the third single from the band's seventh studio album, Mania (2018). The song was played live on Jimmy Kimmel Live! on September 18, 2017, after being debuted at House of Blues in Chicago on September 16.

The song was released to alternative radio on May 1, 2018. On June 28, 2018, a remix was released featuring Bülow and MadeinTYO.

The song is featured in the soundtrack of NBA 2K19.

== Background ==
Pete Wentz described the song as "the closest thing to a love song we've had but it's pretty fucking twisted still."

== Composition ==
Critics have described the song as pop rock, synth-pop, electronic rock, and rock.

== Music video ==
The music video for "The Last of the Real Ones" debuted on the same day as the single was released. It features Wentz being attacked by llamas with a shovel after being tied up in the back of a car.

It bears a striking resemblance to the music video for Kanye West's song "Flashing Lights" where Kanye is similarly tied up in the back of a car and is attacked by a woman with a shovel. The video was directed by the duo Mccoy | Meyer.

== Track listing ==
Digital download (remix)
No.	Title	Length
1.	"The Last of the Real Ones" (Remix featuring MadeinTYO and bülow)	3:30

== Credits and personnel ==
Fall Out Boy

- Patrick Stump – lead vocals, rhythm guitars, piano, programming, composition
- Pete Wentz – bass, composition
- Joe Trohman – lead guitars, composition
- Andy Hurley – drums, percussion, composition

Production

- Carlo "Illangelo" Montagnese – composition, production

== Charts ==
=== Weekly charts ===
Chart (2017–2018)	Peak position
Australia (ARIA)	83
Finland Download (Latauslista)	16
New Zealand Heatseekers (RMNZ)	7
Portugal (AFP)	98
UK Singles (Official Charts)	84
US Bubbling Under Hot 100 (Billboard)	23
US Hot Rock & Alternative Songs (Billboard)	5
US Rock & Alternative Airplay (Billboard)	42

=== Year-end charts ===
Chart (2017)	Position
US Hot Rock Songs (Billboard)	75
Chart (2018)	Position
US Hot Rock Songs (Billboard)	100

== Certifications ==
Region	Certification	Certified units/sales
New Zealand (RMNZ)	Gold	15,000^{‡}
United Kingdom (BPI)	Silver	200,000^{‡}
United States (RIAA)	Platinum	1,000,000^{‡}
^{‡} Sales+streaming figures based on certification alone.
