= Joe Trohman =

American guitarist (born 1984)

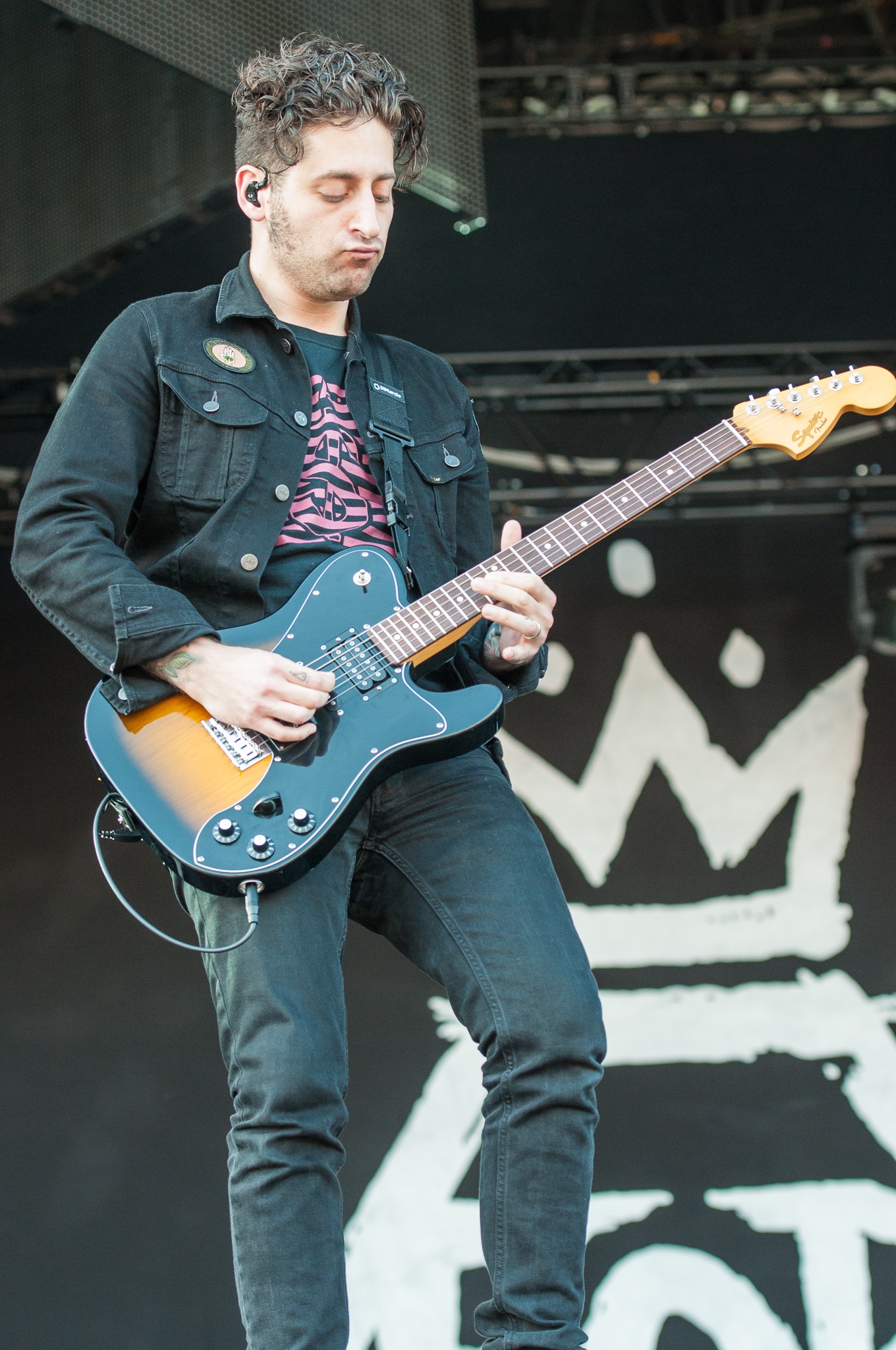
- Trohman performing with Fall Out Boy in 2014

Background information
- Born: Joseph Mark Trohman; September 1, 1984 (age 42); Hollywood, Florida, U.S.
- Origin: South Russell, Ohio, U.S.
- Genres: Pop-punk; pop rock; alternative rock; emo; emo pop; heavy metal; hard rock; metalcore; hardcore punk
- Occupation: Musician
- Instrument: Guitar
- Years active: 2001–present
- Member of: Fall Out Boy; The Damned Things
- Formerly of: With Knives; Arma Angelus; Voices Still Heard
- Spouse: Marie Wortman Goble (m. 2011)
- Children: 2

Joseph Mark Trohman (born September 1, 1984) is an American musician. He is the co-founder, guitarist and backing vocalist of the rock band Fall Out Boy, as well as the lead guitarist for heavy metal supergroup the Damned Things. Fall Out Boy began in 2001 as Trohman and Pete Wentz's side project from the hardcore punk scene they were involved with, and the band has scored four number one albums on the US Billboard 200, as well as numerous platinum and multi platinum singles in the US and abroad.

After a five-year hiatus, Fall Out Boy announced a comeback with a new album, tour, and single in February 2013. Since then, the band has released four full-length albums, along with two EPs, a remix album, and a second greatest-hits compilation.

== Early life ==
The son of a cardiologist, Trohman was born in Hollywood, Florida. He was raised in South Russell, Ohio, before his family moved to the Chicago area. His family is Jewish, although he noted to JVibe, "I think we were more Jewish culturally than we were religiously because after my brother's bar mitzvah, we stopped going to synagogue entirely." Trohman attended New Trier High School in Winnetka, Illinois, and played bass with fellow Fall Out Boy band member Pete Wentz in a band called Arma Angelus. As mentioned in his memoir, Trohman has a younger brother.

== Career ==
Trohman became involved with the Chicago hardcore punk scene, with his first band being Voices Still Heard he formed with friends. At the age of fifteen he taught himself how to play guitar, and at age sixteen, he joined local band Arma Angelus and spent a summer touring as the group's bassist. He developed a friendship with the group's singer, Pete Wentz, and the pair discussed forming a more melodic band influenced by groups such as Green Day. Trohman then met Patrick Stump in a Borders bookstore, and recruited him to join the band, which was subsequently named Fall Out Boy.

With bassist Pete Wentz as Fall Out Boy's primary lyricist and vocalist Patrick Stump as the primary composer, Fall Out Boy reached mainstream success with its major label debut, From Under the Cork Tree. Released in 2005 by Island Records, the album debuted on the US Billboard 200 at No. 9, won several awards and achieved triple platinum status after selling more than 3.5 million albums in the United States. The album spawned two top 10 hits; "Sugar, We're Goin Down" which reached No. 8 on the Billboard Hot 100 and has sold more than 4.5 million copies in the US as of 2019, as well as "Dance, Dance" which peaked at No. 9 and certified triple platinum. To support the album, the band headlined tours around the world in 2005 and 2006.

In 2007, the band released the follow-up album Infinity on High, to major chart success, debuting No. 1 on the Billboard 200 with first week sales of 260,000. The album was certified platinum one month after its release. Infinity on High's lead single, "This Ain't a Scene, It's an Arms Race", reached No. 1 on the defunct-Pop 100, No. 2 on the Billboard Hot 100, and later certified platinum. The second single, "Thnks fr th Mmrs", sold more than 2 million copies in the US.

In 2008, the band released their fifth studio album, Folie à Deux which debuted at No. 8 on the Billboard 200 with 150,000 first week sales and was later certified gold. The band opened for Blink-182's 2009 reunion tour and shortly released their first greatest hits compilation album, Believers Never Die - Greatest Hits in November 2009 before announcing an indefinite hiatus. Patrick Stump embarked on a solo career and Pete Wentz created the DJ duo Black Cards. Trohman and his Fall Out Boy bandmate Andy Hurley started a new band, the Damned Things, with Anthrax members Scott Ian and Rob Caggiano and Every Time I Die vocalist Keith Buckley and bassist Josh Newton. They released their debut album in 2010, Ironiclast. Afterwards, Trohman began work on a new band with Newton and Rob Smith, With Knives, releasing their debut EP, Schadenfreude on April 17, 2012.

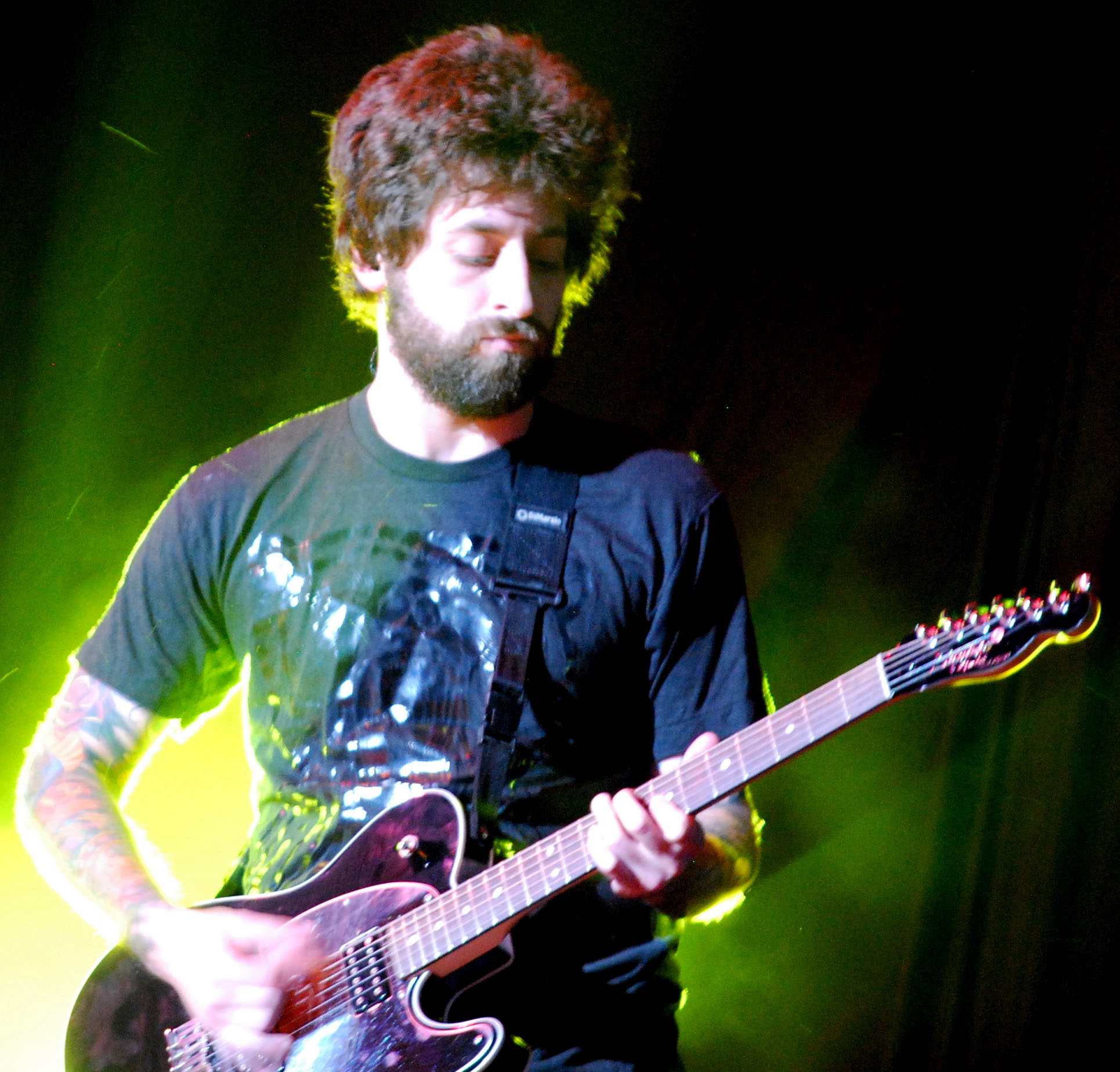
Trohman performing with Fall Out Boy in 2009

On February 4, 2013, Fall Out Boy unexpectedly announced their return with their first single in three years, My Songs Know What You Did in the Dark (Light Em Up), the announcement of a new album, Save Rock and Roll, and dates for a new headlining tour. April 12 of the same year brought the release of Save Rock And Roll. The band played their first show in over three years on the night of February 4 in Chicago. Save Rock and Roll peaked at No. 1 on the Billboard 200, selling 154,000 copies in its first week, and becoming the band's 4th consecutive top 10 album. The band toured heavily throughout 2013 and 2014 on the album, selling out arenas worldwide with bands like Paramore and Panic! at the Disco. In October 2013, they released an EP titled PAX AM Days, which was an homage to the classic punk music the band grew up on. The entire EP was recorded in two days with producer Ryan Adams at the PAX AM Studios in Los Angeles.

Their sixth album American Beauty/American Psycho was released in January 2015, preceded by the Four-Times-Platinum top 10 single Centuries. The album's second single, Uma Thurman, was released to mainstream radio on April 14, 2015, and peaked at 22 on the Billboard Hot 100, and was certified Double-Platinum. The third single from American Beauty/American Psycho, Irresistible, also landed on the Billboard Hot 100 and peaked at number 48, while also later being certified platinum in the US. On October 14, 2014, Immortals was released as a single, later to be featured on the Disney movie it was written for, Big Hero 6. The song went on to be added as the tenth track on American Beauty/American Psycho. On October 30, 2015, Fall Out Boy released an album of remixes titled Make America Psycho Again, featuring artists such as Wiz Khalifa, Azealia Banks, and Migos.

In April 2017, Fall Out Boy released Young and Menace, the lead single for their seventh studio album, Mania. The original release date for Mania was set in September 2017, but was pushed back in August of that same year due to the fact that, according to a tweet from lead singer Patrick Stump, "The album just really [wasn't] ready, and it felt very rushed". Mania was officially released on January 19, 2018, and debuted at number one on the Billboard 200, making it the band's third consecutive number one album, and fourth chart-topping debut overall. Despite the fact that the album had not yet been released, the band embarked on the Mania Tour in the fall of 2017, a worldwide tour spanning the end of 2017 and into fall of 2018. This tour included a date at Wrigley Field in the band's hometown of Chicago, marking a milestone in their career as their first headline show at a stadium.

In 2017, Trohman guest starred, with his bandmates, in Cartoon Network's Teen Titans Go! playing himself in the first, third and fourth parts of "The Night Begins to Shine". Their cover of the title song from the special was commercially released.

On August 23, 2018, Fall Out Boy surprise-released their third EP, Lake Effect Kid, which the band describes as their "love letter" to their hometown of Chicago. A demo version of the title track was previously featured on the band's 2008 mixtape Welcome to the New Administration.

In April 2019, the Damned Things released their second album, High Crimes, almost nine years after the release of their debut album, Ironiclast.

On September 10, 2019, Fall Out Boy released Dear Future Self (Hands Up) as a single off of their second greatest hits album, Greatest Hits: Believers Never Die – Volume Two, released on November 15, 2019. The same day, the band announced their co-headlining tour with Green Day and Weezer, The Hella Mega Tour, scheduled to begin in spring of 2020. Due to the COVID-19 pandemic, all North American dates were rescheduled to the summer of 2021, European dates were rescheduled to the summer of 2022, and Asian and Oceania dates were cancelled.

On January 18, 2023, the same day as the announcement of Fall Out Boy's eighth album, So Much (for) Stardust, Trohman announced on social media that he would be taking a break from the band to focus on his mental health. He returned to the band in May 2023.

== Equipment ==
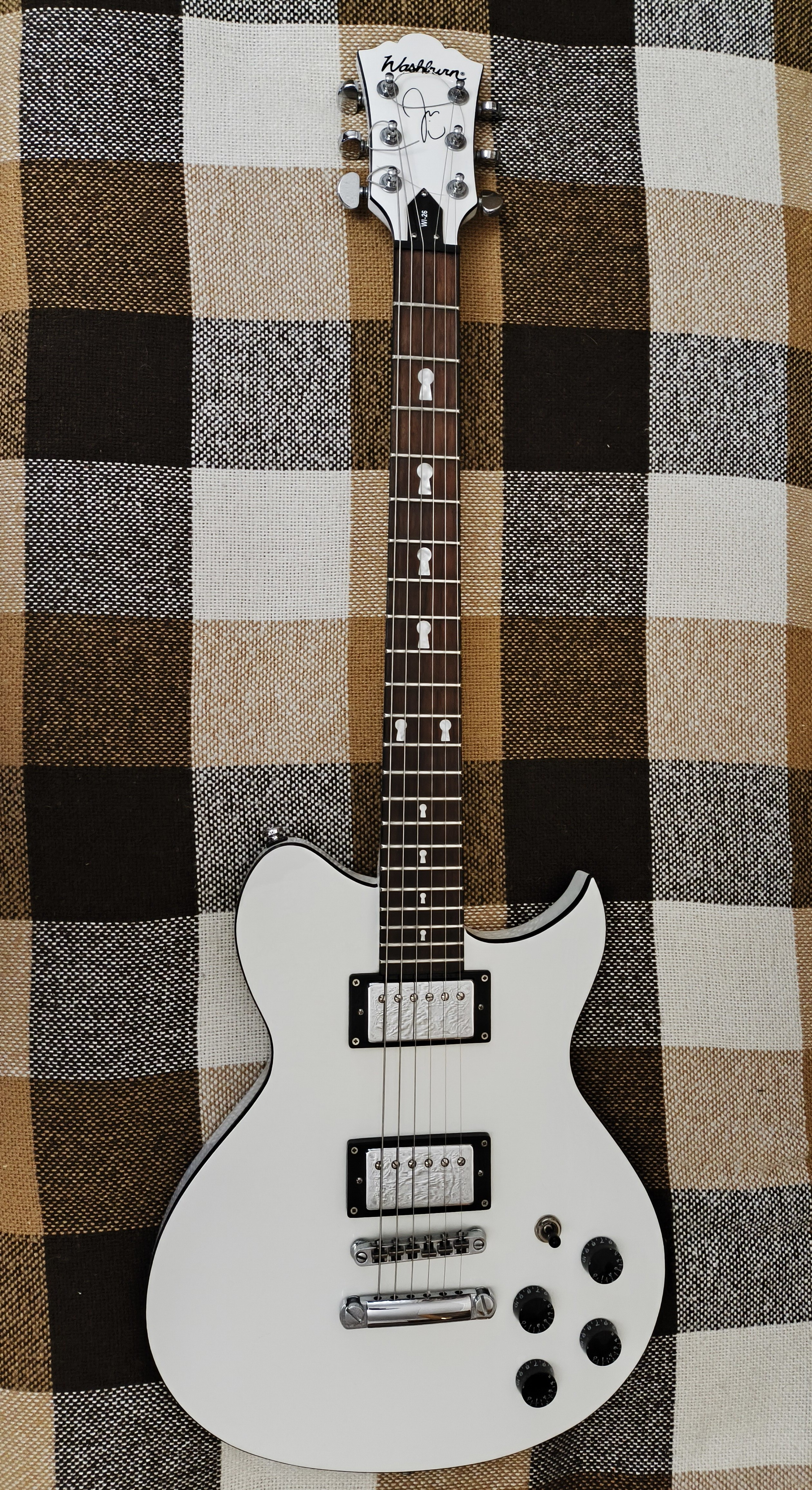
Washburn Idol WI-26 Joe Trohman signature model

Trohman collects guitars, and has his own Signature guitar made by Squier Guitars by Fender, the Joe Trohman Telecaster. He currently plays Fender Telecasters, and Fender Stratocaster in studio or live. He had previously used Washburn guitars and a Gibson SG.

== Personal life ==
Trohman is married to Marie Wortman Goble, and the couple have two daughters together, Ruby and Zayda Mae.

Trohman's house in Chicago was featured in a 2007 episode of MTV Cribs.

Trohman created an animated series in 2020 called Mondo Trasho 3042 on YouTube. The ten-episode series is about a fictional band in the titular year of 3042. The show's intro explains '“We’re Mondo Trasho. We’re a band. We should break up.”

Trohman has always been open about his struggles with his mental health, specifically how he has dealt with his depression, OCD, and impostor syndrome throughout his life. On March 10, 2021, Trohman announced his podcast I Hate Myself, in partnership with Heavy Metal Magazine and Seth Green. The first episode aired a week later, on March 17, 2021. Each episode of the podcast features a guest who joins Trohman and Green to speak about their mental health. I Hate Myself currently has one season with six episodes, although Trohman and Green have hinted at the possibility of airing new episodes eventually. Notable guests on I Hate Myself include Emma Chamberlain, George C. Romero, and Ryan Simpkins.

In March 2022, the first issue of The Axe, a comic written by Trohman and Brian Posehn and illustrated by Scott Koblish, was released in Heavy Metal Magazine. The Axe is a horror-comedy story about three teenagers who steal a cursed guitar, opening up a portal to Sheol, an alternate dimension.

Trohman's memoir, None of This Rocks, was released on September 13, 2022. Trohman embarked on a 4-stop book tour supporting None of This Rocks beginning September 13, 2022, in Brooklyn, New York, and ending on September 20, 2022, in Los Angeles, California.

In November 2023, the first issue of Holy Roller, a comic written by Trohman, Rick Remender, Andy Samberg and illustrated by Roland Boschi, was released and published by Image Comics. Holy Roller is about a pro bowler who is forced to quit his dream job and return to his hometown, which he soon discovers has been overrun by Neo-Nazis, leading him to become a trick bowling ball-wielding Jewish superhero.
