= Bounce (The Cab song) =

Single by The Cab

from the album Whisper War
- Released: October 30, 2008
- Studio: Red Bull Studios (Santa Monica)
- Genre: Neon pop-punk
- Length: 3:35
- Label: Decaydance; Fueled by Ramen
- Songwriters: Alexander DeLeon; Alex T. Marshall; Ian Crawford; Cash Colligan; Alex Johnson
- Producer: Matt Squire

The Cab singles chronology
"One of Those Nights" (2008)	"Bounce" (2008)	"Bad" (2011)

Music video
- "Bounce" on YouTube

"Bounce" is a song by American rock band the Cab. It was released on October 30, 2008, as the third and final single from their debut studio album, Whisper War. The song features additional vocals from Patrick Stump of Fall Out Boy. It reached number 69 on the Pop 100 Airplay chart.

== Background ==
The song was featured as a free download on Rock Band 2. A snippet of "Bounce" was also included on Fall Out Boys' mixtape, Welcome to the New Administration.

== Composition ==
"Bounce" was written by Alexander DeLeon, Alex T. Marshall, Ian Crawford, Cash Colligan and Alex Johnson, while production was handled by Matt Squire. Recorded at Red Bull Studios in Santa Monica, the song also features additional vocals from Patrick Stump, who also co-produced the track. The song is described as neon pop-punk, and contains influences reminiscent to NSYNC, as well as elements of R&B. Ian Crawford who played lead guitar on the track, broke down his parts with Guitar World where he revealed he played basic shapes and lead fills in the song.

== Live performances ==
During a concert in Newark, New Jersey, on January 22, 2009, The Cab performed the song live with Brendon Urie of Panic! at the Disco, who was a surprise guest at the show.

== Music video ==
The music video for "Bounce" premiered via MTV on October 30, 2008. The video was directed by Jordan Barrow. The video features the band performing dressed in all-white clothing, while the audience is given drinks filled with acrylic paint, before a paint fight breaks out. It features a cameo appearance from Patrick Stump.

== Personnel ==
Credits for "Bounce" retrieved from album's liner notes.

The Cab

- Alex DeLeon – vocals
- Cash Colligan – bass guitar
- Alex Johnson – drums
- Alex Marshall – piano
- Ian Crawford – guitar

Additional musicians

- Patrick Stump – additional instrumentation, additional vocals

Production

- Matt Squire – producer, engineer
- Patrick Stump – additional production
- Eric Stenman – engineer
- Bill Lefler – additional engineering
- Machine – mixing
- Scott Hull – mastering

== Charts ==
Chart performance for "Bounce"
Chart (2009)	Peak position
Singapore Airplay (Mediacorp)	11
US Pop 100 Airplay (Billboard)	69

== Release history ==
Release dates and formats for "Bounce"
Region	Date	Format	Label	Ref.
United States	October 30, 2008	CD single	Decaydance; Fueled by Ramen	
