= Symphony Soldier =

Studio album by the Cab
- Released: August 23, 2011
- Recorded: 2011
- Studio: Foxy Studios (Los Angeles)
- Genre: Pop rock; pop punk; alternative rock; power pop
- Length: 45:29
- Label: Self-released
- Producer: John Feldmann

The Cab chronology
The Lady Luck EP (2009)	Symphony Soldier (2011)	Lock Me Up (2014)

Singles from Symphony Soldier
- 1. "Bad" Released: July 11, 2011; 2. "Angel with a Shotgun" Released: November 2011; 3. "La La" Released: April 10, 2012; 4. "Endlessly" Released: September 18, 2012

Symphony Soldier is the second studio album by American rock band the Cab. It was self-released by the band on August 23, 2011. The Cab first rose to prominence at the peak of the mid-2000s emo pop trend with their debut album Whisper War (2008), which was promoted via national tours with Hey Monday and the Hush Sound. The following year, two members left the band, guitarist Ian Crawford and bassist Cash Colligan. In addition, the band soon parted ways with their original label, Fueled by Ramen, as well as parting ways with their drummer Alex Johnson in 2011.

The album is a pop rock, pop-punk, alternative rock, and power pop record. It was recorded at Foxy Studios, and was produced by John Feldmann. It boasts a wide array of songwriting collaborators, including Bruno Mars, Maroon 5's Adam Levine and Jesse Carmichael, Fall Out Boy's Pete Wentz, and production team the Messengers. Its commercial performance was middling, with the album charting on the Billboard 200 at number 62. It was the Cab's last proper album until 2026's Chasing Crowns; though the band signed to Universal Republic the next year and issued an EP, Lock Me Up, in 2014, it was officially dissolved.

== Background and production ==
On June 22, 2011, The Cab announced that they were departing from their label Fueled by Ramen and Decaydance Records before previewing a 90-second teaser for their second studio album, Symphony Soldier. The group also parted ways with their drummer Alex Johnson. Lead singer Alexander DeLeon went in depth about his departure stating, "he was having a difficult time with things, and we were completely here, as friends and family. Once things started happening and we started talking to him about things, we realized we needed to be friends first before bandmates, you know?." The group had lost Ian Crawford and Cash Colligan two years prior to the album's release, with Crawford leaving the group due to creative differences. However, Crawford was credited for playing guitar on the album. Bassist Joey Thunder also joined the band in 2009, as Colligan's replacement.

Symphony Soldier was entirely funded by the group, and was self-released. Most of the music and lyrics for the album were written by band members and features guest artists including, Pete Wentz and John Feldmann co-writing "Grow Up and Be Kids", Bruno Mars with "Endlessly", Adam Levine with "Animal", Martin Johnson with "Bad" and Nasri and Adam Messinger with "Temporary Bliss". It was produced by John Feldmann, and recorded at his home studio, Foxy Studios. Musician Brandon Paddock performed guitar and bass on the LP, with Crawford and Devin Bronson contributing additional guitar. Dean Butterworth, who is best known for his work with Good Charlotte, handled all drum work. Alex Marshall said the album "sums up what we've been through over the past two years." DeLeon described the album's sound as R&B, citing influence from Michael Jackson.

The group was previously writing with S*A*M and Sluggo, Rob Knox and Claude Kelly for the album in 2010, however, the group decided to scrap most of those songs as "it was sounding like an American Idol record," according to DeLeon, which was something the band was not going for. He also revealed that creative differences with Fueled by Ramen was the reason for the delayed album release and felt that since departing from the label, they could do what they wanted. The band debuted the tracks "Temporary Bliss" and "Locked Up" during their performance at the 2010 Vans Warped Tour, the latter did not appear on the album. Another song that was intended to be on the album was "Til I Forget About You", however, it was given to Big Time Rush. The song "La La" was written by DeLeon when he was sixteen years old. According to DeLeon, he kept the song with him for 7–8 years because he "loved" the chorus, but couldn't write a good verse for it. After working with Feldmann to finish writing the track, it was released as a single.

== Release ==
The album's first single, "Bad," was released to iTunes on July 11, 2011, and was announced by the band on July 18; a music video for the song was later released. Pre-orders were available on the band's webstore, the only place the physical album can be purchased. Their webstore offered 11 options, with prices ranging from $10 to $10,000. The album art and track listing was revealed on July 19. The album was officially released on August 23. In November 2011, the group released "Angel with a Shotgun" as the second single from the album in Singapore only. On April 10, the group released the music video for "La La". A music video for "Endlessly" on November 15, and the video features an appearance from actress Hailee Steinfeld.

== Promotion ==
In support of Symphony Soldier the band toured as headliners and supporters, as well as playing at radio station sponsored shows. They embarked on a US headlining tour for five dates. During this time, the band opened for All Time Low and Simple Plan for their US fall tour in 2011, Avril Lavigne on a Canadian arena concert tour, and Maroon 5 during their Asia Pacific tour in 2012. They also co-headlined the Everything's Fine Symphony Soldier tour during January and February 2012, alongside The Summer Set, with supporting acts He Is We, Days Difference, and Paradise Fears. They joined Daytrader on the Zumiez Couch tour in June. The band also co-headlined a tour with Parachute in the summer of 2012.

== Critical reception ==
Professional ratings
Review scores
Source	Rating
Absolutepunk.net	95%
AllMusic	3/5 stars
Alternative Press	4/5 stars
Sputnikmusic	3.5/5 stars

The album received critical praise, with AbsolutePunk particularly giving it a highly positive review with a rating of 95%, calling the album a "masterpiece." Annie Zeleski of Alternative Press gave it 4/5 and said that "For loyal fans of the Cab, Symphony Soldier lives up to expectations; it's the album they've been waiting for since 2008". SputnikMusic reviewer DaveyBoy gave Symphony Soldier a 3.5/5 ("great"), concluding "At 46 minutes, the album is undoubtedly overlong and repetitive, yet there is no real filler, just some redundancy in its mid-section. It is the kind of misstep that is predominantly forgivable when such a young band are looking to extend themselves, as The Cab are on Symphony Soldier". He recommended the tracks "Temporary Bliss", "Angel with a Shotgun", "Another Me", and "Living Louder". Chrysta Cherrie of AllMusic gave the album 3/5 stars and called it "the sound of a band taking control of its destiny and breaking free from the industry standards", adding that "fans as well as new listeners will take pleasure in being along for the ride". In 2016, Billboard contributor Joe DeAndrea referred to the album as "arguably one of the most ambitious pop-rock records in recent memory."

== Commercial performance ==
Symphony Soldier debuted on the US Billboard 200 at number 62, where it would peak. The album also charted at number 9 on the Top Rock Albums chart and peaked at number 6 on the Independent Albums chart. The album's lead single, "Bad" peaked at number 29 on the US Adult Pop Airplay. The second single, "La La" peaked at number one in Singapore. The opening track "Angel with a Shotgun" charted at number 3 in Singapore, and was certified Gold by the Recording Industry Association of America (RIAA) on October 20, 2023.

== Track listing ==
No.	Title	Writer(s)	Length
1.	"Angel with a Shotgun"	Alex DeLeon; Alex Marshall; Evan Taubenfeld	3:43
2.	"Temporary Bliss"	DeLeon; Marshall; Nasri Atweh; Adam Messinger	3:45
3.	"Bad"	DeLeon; Marshall; Martin Johnson	3:21
4.	"Endlessly"	DeLeon; Marshall; Bruno Mars; Phil Lawrence; Mike Daly	3:58
5.	"Animal"	DeLeon; Marshall; Adam Levine; Sam Farrar	3:51
6.	"Intoxicated"	DeLeon; Marshall; Aaron Edwards; Yultron	4:09
7.	"La La"	DeLeon; Marshall; John Feldmann	3:26
8.	"Her Love Is My Religion"	DeLeon; Marshall; Feldmann	3:48
9.	"Another Me"	DeLeon; Marshall; David Hodges; Steven Miller	3:25
10.	"Grow Up and Be Kids"	DeLeon; Marshall; Feldmann; Pete Wentz	3:10
11.	"Lovesick Fool"	DeLeon; Marshall	4:17
12.	"Living Louder"	DeLeon; Marshall	4:43
Total length:			45:29

iTunes bonus track
No.	Title	Length
13.	"La La" (Gldhouse Remix)	4:14
14.	"La La" (Feelgud Remix)	3:21

Japanese bonus track
No.	Title	Length
13.	"Endlessly" (Feelgud Remix)	3:37

== Personnel ==
Credits adapted from album's liner notes.

The Cab

- Alexander DeLeon – lead vocals
- Alex Marshall – rhythm guitar, piano, backing vocals
- Joey Thunder – bass guitar

Additional personnel

- John Feldmann – production
- Ian Crawford – guitar
- Dean Butterworth – drums
- Devin Bronson – guitar on "Angel with a Shotgun"
- Brandon Paddock – guitar, bass, additional programming and arrangements
- Martin Johnson from Boys Like Girls – additional production on "Bad"

== Charts ==
Chart performance for Symphony Soldier
Chart (2011)	Peak position
US Billboard 200	62
US Independent Albums (Billboard)	6
US Top Rock Albums (Billboard)	9

== Release history ==
Region	Date	Format	Label	Ref.
Various	August 23, 2011	CD; digital download	Z Entertainment	
Japan	July 11, 2012	CD; digital download	Twilight	
United Kingdom	September 24, 2012	CD	Z Entertainment	
