= Like Vines =

Studio album by the Hush Sound
- Released: June 6, 2006
- Genre: Alternative rock, indie rock
- Length: 35:51
- Label: Decaydance Records; Fueled by Ramen
- Producer: Patrick Stump; Sean O'Keefe; Dan Duszynski

The Hush Sound chronology
So Sudden (2005)	Like Vines (2006)	Goodbye Blues (2008)

Professional ratings
Review scores
Source	Rating
AbsolutePunk.net	(84%)
Allmusic	3.5/5 stars

Like Vines is the second studio album by the Hush Sound. The name of the album comes from a line in "We Intertwined". Like Vines has sold over 50,000 copies in the United States, according to Nielsen Soundscan. It was released on Fall Out Boy's Pete Wentz's Decaydance Records independent record label along with Fueled By Ramen. It was produced by Fall Out Boy's lead singer Patrick Stump, along with Sean O'Keefe (who had produced Fall Out Boy's Take This to Your Grave album), and Dan Duszynski.

== Track listing ==
All songs written by Bob Morris and Greta Salpeter, except where noted.

1. "We Intertwined" (Morris, Salpeter, Chris Faller) – 3:16
2. "A Dark Congregation" – 3:12
3. "Sweet Tangerine" – 3:03
4. "Lions Roar" – 2:52
5. "Lighthouse" – 2:59
6. "Don't Wake Me Up" – 3:41
7. "Where We Went Wrong" – 3:31
8. "Magnolia" – 3:49
9. "Wine Red" – 2:34
10. "Out Through the Curtain" – 3:27
11. "You Are the Moon" (Salpeter) – 3:27

== Personnel ==
- Bob Morris – vocals, guitar
- Chris Faller – bass, backing vocals
- Darren Wilson – drums, backing vocals
- Greta Salpeter – piano, vocals
- Roy Carter – trumpet on "Lions Roar" and "We Intertwined"
- Johnny "Showtime" Janowiak – trombone on "Lions Roar" and "We Intertwined"
- Brian Doherty – upright bass on "Lighthouse" and "You Are the Moon"
- Matthew Ginsberg – mandolin on "Lighthouse"
- Jon Alvin – spacebox on "Lions Roar"
- Patrick Stump – vocals on "Don't Wake Me Up" and "Wine Red"
