= So Sudden =

Studio album by The Hush Sound
- Released: March 11, 2005 (independent); October 11, 2005 (mainstream)
- Genre: Indie pop, indie rock
- Length: 38:21
- Label: None (independent); Decaydance, Fueled by Ramen (mainstream)

The Hush Sound chronology
| So Sudden (2005) | Like Vines (2006) |

So Sudden is the debut album of The Hush Sound. It was first released independently during early 2005. It was re-released after the band signed to Decaydance Records, Fall Out Boy's Pete Wentz's independent record label.

== Track listing ==
All songs written by Bob Morris and Greta Salpeter, except where noted.

1. "City Traffic Puzzle" (3:29)
2. "Weeping Willow" (2:17)
3. "Crawling Towards the Sun" (2:57)
4. "The Artist" (3:36)
5. "Unsafe Safe" (3:34)
6. "Momentum" (3:32)
7. "Hourglass" (2:37)
8. "Echo" (4:59)
9. "My Apologies" (2:16)
10. "The Market" (Morris, Chris Faller) (1:54)
11. "Tides Change" (1:22)
12. "Carry Me Home" (2:17)
13. "Eileen" (3:31)

== Personnel ==
- Bob Morris - vocals, guitar
- Chris Faller - bass, backing vocals
- Darren Wilson - drums, backing vocals
- Greta Salpeter - piano, vocals

== Recording ==
So Sudden was recorded at The Gallery of Carpet Studios in Villa Park, IL with owner/engineer/producer Brian Zieske.
"The Artist", the fourth track, contains many allusions to Oscar Wilde's The Picture of Dorian Gray, primarily the prologue. The thirteenth track, "Eileen", also contains an allusion to Robert Herrick’s poem "To the Virgins, to Make Much of Time".
