= Goodbye Blues =

Studio album by The Hush Sound
- Released: March 18, 2008
- Recorded: Fairfax Recordings (United States) Hollywood, California
- Genre: Indie rock, blues rock
- Length: 39:07
- Label: Fueled by Ramen, Decaydance
- Producer: Kevin Augunas

The Hush Sound chronology
Like Vines (2006)	Goodbye Blues (2008)

Singles from Goodbye Blues
- 1. "Honey" Released: February 5, 2008; 2. "Medicine Man" Released: November 18, 2008

Professional ratings
Review scores
Source	Rating
AbsolutePunk.net	(85%)
Allmusic	3.5/5 stars
ThePunkSite.com	2.5/5 stars
Stereology	(7/10)

Goodbye Blues is the third and final studio album by The Hush Sound. It was released March 18, 2008 on Fueled by Ramen/Decaydance and later debuted at #75 on the Billboard 200 selling over 11,200 copies. The next week the album fell to #163.

== Background ==
The band's third studio album, Goodbye Blues, was named one of the Most Anticipated Albums of 2008 by Alternative Press. The album was recorded in the fall of 2007 at North Hollywood's Fairfax Recordings with producer/engineer Kevin Augunas (Cold War Kids, Jon Brion) at the helm. With tracks such as "Honey" and "Medicine Man", The Hush Sound shows influence of blues, swing, and folk. The album is different than the band's last two albums, as Greta Salpeter takes over lead vocals on nine of the thirteen tracks.

Goodbye Blues was available for pre-order from January 29, through The Hush Sound's official website. After preordering it, a free digital download of "Honey" is available.

On October 23, 2007, The Hush Sound posted a video on FriendsorEnemies.com featuring a list of songs they were working on.

=== Viral marketing ===
The Hush Sound has been using viral marketing to promote their new album along with a supporting spot on the Honda Civic Tour. One of these schemes used is the use of a person known as "The Medicine Man" who has been giving clues, such as song clips, videos, and images to its friends on Myspace, Friends or Enemies, and Sweet Tangerine. The Medicine Man has also sent a picture to Greta in the video for "Honey," as seen at the end.

== Track listing ==
All songs written by Greta Salpeter, except where noted.

1. "Intro" – 1:29
2. "Honey" – 3:39
3. "Medicine Man" – 3:23
4. "The Boys Are Too Refined" (Salpeter, Bob Morris, Anne Preven, Scott Cutler) – 3:17
5. "Hurricane" (Salpeter, Cutler, Preven) – 3:12
6. "As You Cry" (Morris) – 3:25
7. "Six" (Interlude) – 2:23
8. "Molasses" – 3:51
9. "That's Okay" – 3:18
10. "Not Your Concern" (Morris, Cutler, Preven, Darren Wilson) – 2:57
11. "Love You Much Better" (Salpeter, Morris, Bradley Walker) – 3:17
12. "Hospital Bed Crawl" (Morris, Chris Faller) – 2:37
13. "Break the Sky" (Salpeter, Cutler, Preven) – 3:19

=== Bonus tracks ===
iTunes U.S. Store

- "You Are My Home" – 3:11
- "Pretty Down to Your Bones" – 3:11
- "The Making of Goodbye Blues" (video)
- "Wine Red" (music video)

== Personnel ==
- Bob Morris – vocals, guitar
- Chris Faller – bass, backing vocals
- Darren Wilson – drums, backing vocals
- Greta Salpeter – piano, vocals

== Chart positions ==
Chart (2007)	Peak position
U.S. Billboard 200	75
