= Bad (The Cab song) =

Single by The Cab

from the album Symphony Soldier
- Released: July 11, 2011
- Genre: Pop rock • power pop
- Length: 3:20
- Label: Cadillac Music; Z Entertainment
- Songwriters: Alexander DeLeon; Alex T. Marshall; Martin Johnson
- Producer: John Feldmann

The Cab singles chronology
"Bounce" (2008)	"Bad" (2011)	"La La" (2012)

Music video
- "Bad" on YouTube

"Bad" is a song by American rock band the Cab. It was released on July 11, 2011, as the lead single from their second studio album, Symphony Soldier. The song was released independently through Cadillac Music and Z Entertainment, and was written by members Alexander DeLeon and Alex T. Marshall and Martin Johnson of Boys Like Girls.

== Background ==
"Bad" was released as the album's lead single on July 11, 2011, ahead of the release of their second studio album, Symphony Soldier. The song also debuted on Sirius XM Radio. The song was released in the United Kingdom on September 17, 2012.

== Composition ==
"Bad" was written by Alexander DeLeon, Alex T. Marshall and Martin Johnson, while production was handled by John Feldmann. According to the sheet music published at Musicnotes.com, by Alfred Music Publishing, the track runs at 100 BPM and is in the key of E major. Deleon's range in the song spans from the notes B3 to C#6. Lyrically, the song finds DeLeon singing about a relationship gone bad, admitting that "he's not typically one to walk away from a good girl, he's had enough of their love: Baby, I know that you're good / But I don't want a good girl, no not today."

== Critical reception ==
Professional ratings
Review scores
Source	Rating
Melodic	4/5 stars

Kaj Roth of Melodic gave the song a positive review describing it as "Maroon 5 meeting Family Force 5." Amanda Hensel of PopCrush also gave a positive review writing, "Not only are DeLeon and the Cab guys sick of predictable and logical, they're really hoping for someone who stays out until all hours of the night and doesn't answer their phone calls at all." However, she noted "this song lacks in deep and thoughtful lyrics," but "makes up with its unique catchiness and feel-good and smooth vocals."

== Live performances ==
The group posted an acoustic version of "Bad" online in September 2011, as well as performing the song live with co-writer Martin Johnson in July 2012.

== Music video ==
The music video for "Bad" premiered via VEVO on September 14, 2011, and was directed by Lindsay Rosenberg.

== Personnel ==
Credits for "Bad" retrieved from album's liner notes.

The Cab

- Alexander DeLeon – lead vocals
- Alex T. Marshall – rhythm guitar, piano, backing vocals
- Joey Thunder – bass

Additional musicians

- Ian Crawford – guitar
- Brandon Paddock – guitar, bass
- Dean Butterworth – drums

Production

- John Feldmann – producer, mixing
- Martin Johnson – additional producer
- Joe Gastwirt – mastering
- Brandon Paddock – engineering
- Lani Lee – photography

== Charts ==
Chart performance for "Bad"
Chart (2011–12)	Peak position
Singapore Airplay (Mediacorp)	8
US Adult Top 40 (Billboard)	29

== Release history ==
Release dates and formats for "Bad"
Region	Date	Format	Label	Ref.
United States	July 11, 2011	Digital download	Cadillac Music	
United States	July 11, 2011	Contemporary hit radio	Cadillac Music	
United Kingdom	September 17, 2012	Digital download	Z Entertainment	
