= Glitz and Glamour =

EP by The Cab
- Released: 2006
- Genres: Pop rock; alternative rock; emo pop
- Length: 26:45
- Label: Independent

The Cab chronology
| Drunk Love EP (2006) | Glitz and Glamour (2006) | Whisper War (2008) |

Glitz and Glamour is the debut EP by American rock band The Cab.

== Background ==
In an interview with AbsolutePunk, vocalist Alexander DeLeon had this to say about the EP:

"When we wrote the Glitz and Glamour EP, I had only been singing for a few weeks. I was just the guitar player before and had never sung in my life and Cash, our bassist, told me to sing because he liked my voice. At the time I was embarrassed and thought he was crazy, but it seemed to have turned out pretty well. The songs on the Glitz EP are so old and even though they hold a special place in our hearts because those were some of the first songs we wrote."

== Track listing ==
| No. | Title | Length |
|---|---|---|
| 1. | "Glitz and Glamour" | 3:25 |
| 2. | "You've Got the Nerve" | 3:47 |
| 3. | "Whisper Something Fragile" | 4:27 |
| 4. | "Track Four" | 3:22 |
| 5. | "Getting Old" | 3:41 |
| 6. | "Drunk Love" | 3:39 |
| 7. | "Innocent and Sweet" | 4:24 |

== Personnel ==
- Alexander DeLeon: lead vocals
- Cash Colligan: bass guitar
- Alex T. Marshall: rhythm guitar
- Alex Johnson: drums
- Paul Garcia: lead guitar

== Availability ==
The EP was self-released by the band, and it is now very rare and out of print. The only way to listen to the tracks is to download them from a file sharing service. It was well received by fans, who had been eagerly anticipating a release to accompany the songs on the band's MySpace.

== Sound ==
The band's sound has changed since the release of this EP, and the band acknowledges this change. Many fans like the sound from Glitz better than the band's LP, Whisper War, but the band realizes they had to mature at some point. Alex DeLeon had this to say about the change in the band's sound:

"(We) have definitely grown from (the Glitz songs) and our music now is much different. Since then, us and our old guitarist have also gone our separate ways. We are now more soulful and poppy, I think I have finally found my niche and groove in this band and with the songs. Although, the new stuff is way different from our older material, I think that our old fans will still dig it. Like I said before, we just play the music we love and feel and hopefully people like it half as much as we do. I have been listening to a lot of Brian McKnight, Maroon 5, Joss Stone, Justin Timberlake, Stevie Wonder, and Robin Thicke lately."
