= The Lady Luck EP =

EP by The Cab
- Released: June 30, 2009
- Genre: R&B; pop
- Length: 22:55
- Label: Decaydance; Fueled by Ramen
- Producer: Matt Squire; Alex T. Marshall; Kyle Homme

The Cab chronology
Whisper War (2008)	The Lady Luck EP (2009)	Symphony Soldier (2011)

The Lady Luck EP is the third extended play by American rock band The Cab, released on June 30, 2009, through Decaydance and Fueled by Ramen. The EP reached the US Heatseekers Albums chart at number 14.

== Background and release ==
Originally titled What Happens In Vegas, the EP was expected to be released on June 16, 2009. However, on June 13, the group announced a new name for the EP, The Lady Luck EP, along with its track list. The EP features six tracks, including a remix of "Take My Hand" featuring Cassadee Pope of Hey Monday and an acoustic version of "I'll Run". The EP also features previously unreleased track "Lights" and "Diamonds Are Forever (And Forever Is a Long Time)", which was originally released as a bonus track from their debut studio album, Whisper War. On June 19, the EP was streamed to their PureVolume page, before it was officially released on June 30. Prior to the EP's release, lead singer Alexander DeLeon announced on his blog that guitarist Ian Crawford had left the band due to creative differences.

== Composition ==
The EP explores an R&B/pop sound. Tracks such as "I Am Who I Am" lean into that sound. All tracks were written by the band, expect for "I Want to Break Free", which is a cover of the song originally made by Queen and was written by John Deacon. Additional writing came from Brian Lee on "Take My Hand", Darwin Estrada and Gregory Cardillo on "I Am Who I Am", and Dave Katz and Sam Hollander on "Diamonds Are Forever (And Forever Is a Long Time)". All tracks were mastered at Masterdisk in New York City, by Scott Hull.

== Track listing ==
All tracks are written by The Cab except where noted.

No.	Title	Writer(s)	Length
1.	"Take My Hand" (featuring Cassadee Pope) (remix)	The Cab; Brian Lee	3:41
2.	"I Am Who I Am" (featuring Eloquent)	The Cab; Darwin Estrada; Gregory Cardillo	3:39
3.	"Diamonds Are Forever (And Forever Is a Long Time)"	The Cab; Dave Katz; Sam Hollander	3:13
4.	"I'll Run" (strings version)		4:42
5.	"I Want to Break Free"	John Deacon	3:54
6.	"Lights" (bonus track)		3:46
Total length:			22:55

== Personnel ==
Credits for The Lady Luck EP adapted from EP's liner notes.

The Cab

- Alexander DeLeon – vocals
- Alex T. Marshall – piano, guitar
- Alex Johnson – drums
- Cash Colligan – bass

Additional musicians

- Cassadee Pope – featured artist, vocals (track 1)
- Eloquent – featured artist, vocals (track 2)
- Ian Crawford – additional guitar (track 1, 3, 6)
- Bryan Dawson – additional guitar (track 2, 4, 5)

Production

- Matt Squire – producer (track 1, 3, 6), mixing (track 6)
- Alex T. Marshall – producer (track 2, 4, 5)
- Kyle Homme – producer (track 2, 4, 5), mixing (track 2, 4, 5)
- Break – producer (track 2)
- Machine – mixing (track 1, 3)
- Clinton Bradley – mixing (track 1)
- Scott Hull – mastering (Masterdisk, New York City, New York)
- Kevin Luong – cover art, illustration, package design

== Charts ==
Chart performance for The Lady Luck EP
Chart (2009)	Peak position
US Heatseekers Albums (Billboard)	14

== Release history ==
Release history and formats for The Lady Luck EP
Region	Date	Format	Label	Ref.
United States	June 30, 2009	CD	Decaydance; Fueled by Ramen	
Various	September 18, 2009	Digital download	Decaydance; Fueled by Ramen	
