= Lock Me Up =

EP by the Cab
- Released: April 29, 2014
- Recorded: January 2013
- Genre: Pop rock; pop; electropop; R&B
- Length: 18:23
- Label: Republic
- Producer: Steve Mac; Alexander DeLeon

The Cab chronology
Symphony Soldier (2011)	Lock Me Up (2014)	Road to Reign: A Prelude (2025)

Singles from Lock Me Up – EP
- 1. "Lock Me Up" Released: April 28, 2014

Lock Me Up is the fourth EP by American rock band the Cab, released April 29, 2014, through Republic Records in the United States. The EP marks the band's first release since their second full-length studio album Symphony Soldier, released on August 23, 2011. In 2012, the band announced that they were in the studio writing and recording a new album and signed to Republic Records. It debuted on the Billboard 200 at number 44.

== Background and release ==
Writing for the EP began in early June 2012, which was originally made for their third studio album. The band began the progress of recording the EP in January 2013. The group wrote 120 songs during the album/EP cycle and lead vocalist Alexander DeLeon described the EP as "a little darker." Former guitarist Ian Crawford played guitar for the EP. On April 15, 2014, the group posted a teaser video with a date of April 29. Then on April 21, they released a teaser for a new song. A second teaser was released three days later, with the titled being revealed as "Lock Me Up". The week prior to the EP's release, on April 24, guitarist and pianist Alex T. Marshall announced his departure from the band. On April 28, the group released the EP's lead single, "Lock Me Up" and on the following day, the EP under the same name, was released.

== Sound and influence ==
Upon the EP's release, on April 29, the EP was described to have a "poppier/R&B influenced sound" and overall was a "collection of love songs" by Alter the Press. The EP strives away from the band's previous studio album Symphony Soldier's pop punk and alternative rock sound and drives closer to a more recognizable radio friendly, dance-pop and R&B sound. The EP's second track "Moon" is an electropop influenced track fit for top forty radio. The opening self-titled track, "Lock Me Up" reverts to the band's themes on Symphony Soldier, having a similar "thumping marching army" vibe. The EP's third and fourth tracks; "Numbers" and "Stand Up" contain an R&B and urban sound. The final track, "These Are the Lies" experiments with more electronica and dubstep sounds with a piano-driven and violin-influenced opening. It was produced by Steve Mac and co-written by English singer and songwriter John Newman.

== Critical reception ==
Professional ratings
Review scores
Source	Rating
AllMusic	4/5 stars

Matt Collar of AllMusic gave the EP a positive review stating, "Once again showcasing the vocal talents of Alexander DeLeon, Lock Me Up is a high-energy set of songs that, while retaining the Cab's longstanding knack for passionate emo-rock, reveals such varied stylistic influences as dubstep, piano balladry, and four-on-the-floor dance club electronica. In that sense, Lock Me Up brings to mind the emo-soul of Fall Out Boy mixed with the more electronic pop end of Maroon 5."

Alternative Press wrote, "From the title track's boy-band stomp through the gorgeous ballad 'Numbers' (the best pop track DeLeon has penned to date and a song with a fighting chance of netting the singer Top 40 hit) and the R&B-tinged 'These Are The Lies', it's clear the Cab are less about the band and more about showcasing DeLeon's pipes" and criticized the music itself, describing it as "stale if not unimaginative."

== Track listing ==
No.	Title	Writer(s)	Length
1.	"Lock Me Up"	Steve Mac; John Newman; Wayne Hector	3:29
2.	"Moon"	Mac; Alex DeLeon	3:16
3.	"Numbers"	DeLeon; Michael Freesh; Nick Bailey; Trent Mazur; Ryan Ogren	4:09
4.	"Stand Up"	DeLeon; Bailey; Ogren; Johnny Coffer	4:23
5.	"These Are the Lies"	DeLeon; CJ Baran; Alex T. Marshall	3:46

== Personnel ==
Credits adapted from album's liner notes.

The Cab

- Alexander DeLeon – lead vocals
- Alex T. Marshall – rhythm guitar, piano, backing vocals
- Chantry Johnson – lead guitar, backing vocals
- Dave Briggs – drums, percussion
- Joey Thunder – bass guitar

Additional musicians

- Steve Mac – keyboards (track 1–2)
- Chris Laws – drums (track 1)
- Dan Pursey – percussion (track 1–2)
- Paul Gendler – guitar (track 1–2)
- Ian Crawford (track 1–5)
- John Newman – backing vocals (track 1)
- Wayne Hector – backing vocals (track 1)
- James Abrahart – backing vocals (track 1)
- Neal Wilkinson – drums (track 2)
- Michael Freesh – bass (track 3)
- Nick Bailey – backing vocals (track 3)
- Ryan Ogren – backing vocals (track 3), guitar (track 3), keyboards (track 3), bass (track 3)
- Simon Katz – synthesizer (track 3–4), drums (track 5)

Production

- Steve Mac – producer (track 1–2)
- The Blueprint – producer (track 3)
- WHAMS – producer (track 3)
- Johnny Coffer – producer (track 4)
- CJ Baran – producer (track 5)
- Chris Laws – engineer (track 1–2), programming (track 1–2)
- Dan Pursey – engineer (track 1–2)
- John Hanes – engineer (track 1–2)
- Michael Freesh – engineer (track 3)
- Nick Bailey – engineer (track 3)
- Trent Mazur – engineer (track 3)
- Ryan Ogren – engineer (track 3)
- Larry Goetz – engineer (track 3)
- Serban Ghenea – mixing (track 1–2)
- Simon Katz – mixing (track 3–4)
- Jaycen Joshua – mixing (track 5)
- Ryan Kaul – assistant mixing engineer (track 5)

== Charts ==
Chart performance for Lock Me Up
Chart (2014)	Peak position
US Billboard 200	44
