= Road to Reign: A Prelude =

EP by the Cab
- Released: September 26, 2025
- Genre: Pop rock; R&B
- Length: 12:45
- Label: The Cab Records
- Producer: David Pramik; Alexander DeLeon; Alex T. Marshall

The Cab chronology
Lock Me Up (2014)	Road to Reign: A Prelude (2025)	Chasing Crowns (2026)

Road to Reign: A Prelude is the fifth EP by American rock band the Cab, released on September 26, 2025. It was released independently and marks their first release in over ten years, since Lock Me Up (2014). The extended play consists of four new songs that would also be on the band's subsequent third studio album, Chasing Crowns (2026).

== Background and recording ==
After releasing their EP Lock Me Up in 2014, the band went on hiatus, as singer Alexander DeLeon began releasing music under the name Bohnes. However, in a 2017 interview, he hinted at a potential return for the band in the future. In April 2019, DeLeon confirmed that they were working on new music. In January 2020, the band teased a new song via social media, along with an announcement of a new album in the works. In April 2024, the band announced that they had finished making the album and previewed a snippet of a new song titled "Running Late".

In September 2025, the group announced Road to Reign: A Prelude, with a release date for September 26. The EP consists of four tracks: "Pain", "Rollercoaster", "Every Little Lie" and "Stay This Way Forever", which are all set to appear on the band's upcoming third studio album Chasing Crowns. The EP is "meant to be a taste of what's to come," according to DeLeon. Recording sessions were "scattered," with some songs written eight years ago. Prior to these sessions, DeLeon and pianist Alex T. Marshall were not on speaking terms with each other, until Marshall suffered a severe illness, contracting E. coli in his blood. Marshall went in for surgery to get it removed and when DeLeon had found out about it, he decided to reconnect with Marshall, recalling,

"There's just some things that you just realize how stupid and small some things are. And then you just think about the human, again the humanity of it, and you think about the person and all of the good times and the positive things [...] I picked up the phone, and luckily Marshall was okay, and then he came over, and we started talking. And then, we both had other music projects, so we just started playing each other's projects."

As a result, the two embarked on a month-long trip to Bali in 2017, and ended up with two songs that appeared on the EP, "Rollercoaster" and "Every Little Lie". The EP's cover art is Kintsugi, a Japanese art, which DeLeon said the artwork represents the band coming back from hiatus.

== Composition ==
"Rollercoaster" was the first song written out of the four tracks that appeared on the EP, with "Every Little Lie" following afterwards. In a track-by-track interview with Rock Sound, DeLeon said of the opening track "Pain", as "a great opportunity for us to push the band sonically and to take a few risks." On "Rollercoaster", he described the track as a "love letter" to the fans and how it sums up their feelings of reuniting and performing for their fans again, following a ten year hiatus. The EP's third track "Every Little Lie", is "a nod to their favorite 'non-rock' influences," mixing all genres they were inspired by "into one piece of work," according to DeLeon. The final track "Stay This Way Forever" is about "the best days of our lives when we were just happy to be in a band with our best friends and being road dogs seeing the world."

== Critical reception ==
Samuel Stevens of Crucial Rhythm gave a positive review, writing, "Sonically, Road To Reign: A Prelude blends The Cab's signature genre-bending style — pop hooks, rock grit, and R&B smoothness — with the wisdom and perspective gained from so many years away from creating memorable tunes [...] It's not weighed down by nostalgia but instead uses the past as fuel for a vibrant, refreshed sound." Shameless SF described the EP as "a cross between rock and early-2000s pop and R&B," calling it an "excellent return" for the band.

== Track listing ==
No.	Title	Writer(s)	Length
1.	"Pain"	David Pramik; Alexander DeLeon; Alex T. Marshall	2:58
2.	"Rollercoaster"	DeLeon; Marshall; Sean Dhondt; John Miles Jr.	3:21
3.	"Every Little Lie"	DeLeon; Marshall	3:16
4.	"Stay This Way Forever"	DeLeon; Marshall; Katie Cecil; Collin Walsh; Chris Ganoudis	3:10
Total length:			12:45

== Personnel ==
Credits adapted from album's liner notes.

The Cab

- Alexander DeLeon – lead vocals
- Alex T. Marshall – guitar, piano, backing vocals
- Dave Briggs – drums, percussion
- Joey Thunder – bass guitar

Additional musicians

- Chantry Johnson – guitar (track 1)
- David Pramik – backing vocals, guitar, bass, synthesizer (track 1)
- Alna Hofymeyr – backing vocals (track 1)
- Cam Becker – guitar (track 2)
- Chris Loocke – guitar (track 3)
- Brandon Paddock – guitar (track 4)

Production

- Alexander DeLeon – producer
- Alex T. Marshall – producer
- David Pramik – producer (track 1)

== Release history ==
Release dates and formats for Road to Reign: A Prelude
Region	Date	Format	Label	Ref.
Various	September 26, 2025	Digital download; streaming	The Cab Records	
