= The Cab =

American rock band

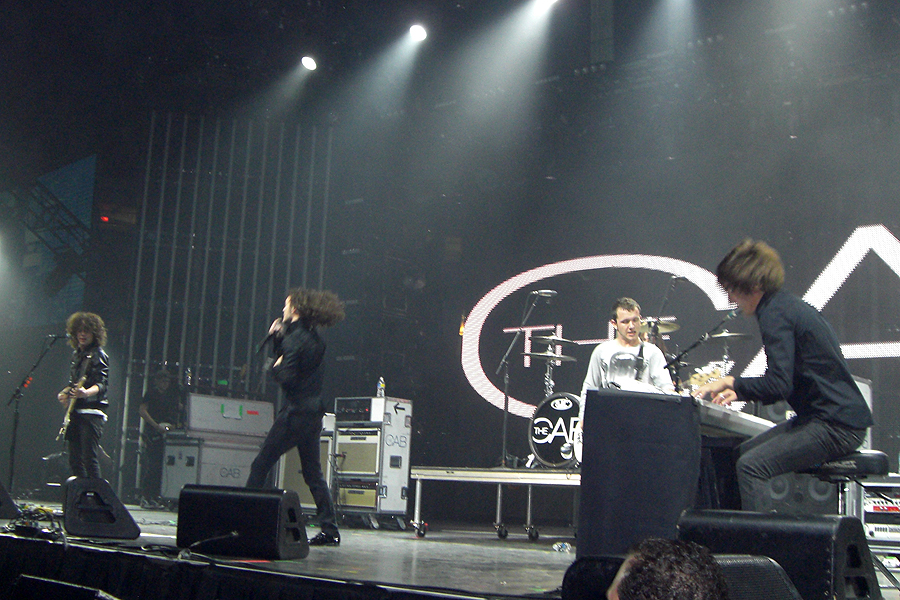
- The Cab performing at the Wachovia Spectrum in November 2008.

Background information
- Origin: Las Vegas, Nevada, U.S.
- Genres: Alternative rock; pop-punk; pop rock; power pop; emo pop; pop
- Years active: 2004–2015; 2019–present
- Labels: Fueled by Ramen; DCD2; Republic; Universal
- Members: Alexander DeLeon; Alex T. Marshall; Joey Thunder; Dave Briggs; Chantry Johnson
- Past members: Alex Johnson; Bryan Dawson; Cash Colligan; Paul Garcia; Ian Crawford; Charles Henry; Frank Sidoris
- Website: thecabband.com

The Cab is an American rock band from Las Vegas, Nevada. The band consists of lead vocalist Alexander DeLeon, rhythm guitarist and keyboardist Alex T. Marshall, lead guitarist Chantry Johnson, bassist Joey Thunder and drummer Dave Briggs. Their debut studio album, Whisper War, was released on April 29, 2008. They have been called "The Band You Need to Know 2008" by Alternative Press magazine. They were also featured in the "100 Bands You Need to Know in 2010" by the magazine and were one of the three bands featured on the cover page, along with Never Shout Never and Hey Monday.

Their second studio album, Symphony Soldier, was released on August 23, 2011, with its first single, "Bad," released to iTunes on July 11, 2011. The Cab funded the entire album by themselves and left their Fueled by Ramen/Decaydance label, self-releasing Symphony Soldier. They released an EP titled Lock Me Up, was released on April 29, 2014, through Republic Records, before going on hiatus.

The band returned in 2025, releasing an EP independently on September 25, titled Road to Reign: A Prelude. They announced their third studio album Chasing Crowns, which was released on April 24, 2026.

== History ==
=== 2004–2008: Formation, early years and rise to fame ===
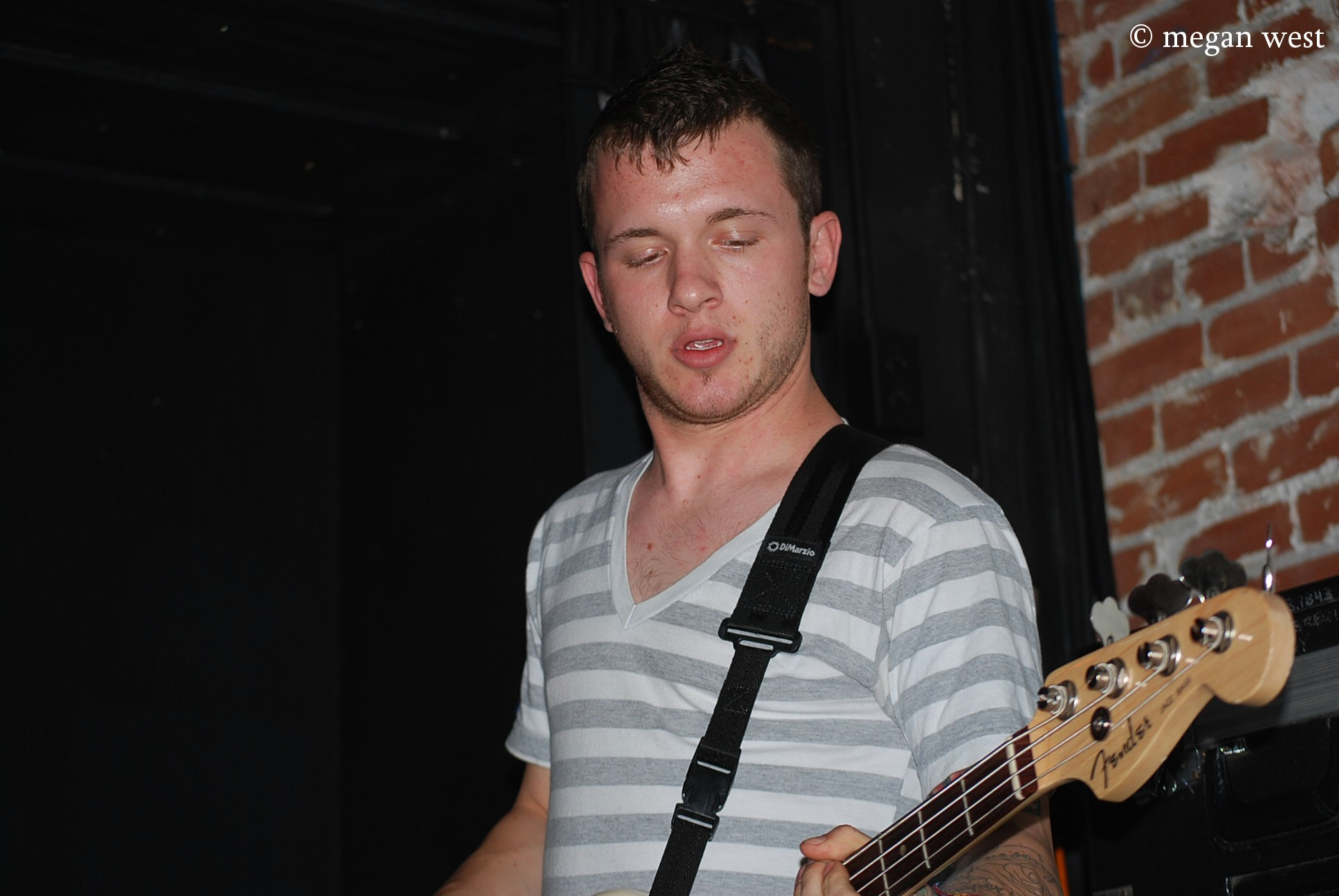
Original bassist Cash Colligan co-founded the band.

Band members Alexander DeLeon and Cash Colligan first began playing music together at Liberty High School and recorded demos which they put up on their MySpace page. The two were coming up with band names and came up with The Strip, The Casino and The Cab. They decided to choose the latter as it felt "the least dumb." They recruited guitarist Paul Garcia and drummer Alex Johnson. They played their first show at the Rock n' Java in December 2005. After playing their first show, the group would spend 10 to 20 hours practicing each week, writing songs and planning shows. The band also signed to local label Olympus Records in January 2006, but released no material. They released two EPs in 2006, Drunk Love and Glitz and Glamour. When they were writing the latter, DeLeon had only been singing for a few weeks after Colligan suggested he sing for the band. After giving a demo to Jon Walker and Spencer Smith of Panic! at the Disco who was impressed with the band, he helped them sign to Decaydance Records and Fueled by Ramen in May 2007. Prior, DeLeon attended Panic! at the Disco's first concert back in August 2005, where he was invited to sing the last chorus to their song "Time to Dance". They had sent them the demos at a Cobra Starship/Boys Like Girls/Cartel show. The group posted a demo of "I'll Run" to their MySpace and announced that a full-length studio album would be released later in the year. Shortly after this, the band's members graduated from high school. During this time they decided added Alex T. Marshall to the group and replaced Garcia with Ian Crawford, who moved from Washington to join the band.

Blender named them No. 75 on their Top 100 Hot Report in September 2007. They were also listed as the "100 Bands You Need to Know in 2008" by Alternative Press. The group embarked on their Driving is Better in the Southwest Weather tour in December 2007, before joining Cobra Starship on their Really Really Ridiculously Good Looking tour the following year. In February 2008, their touring van turned over in Wisconsin, but none of the members were seriously injured, and they only missed one tour date. In March 2008, the band played SXSW. They also joined Metro Station and Forever the Sickest Kids on their US tour in May 2008.

=== 2008–2010: Whisper War ===
The group began recording their debut studio album in October 2007, at Red Bull Studios in Santa Monica. The album titled, Whisper War was released on April 29, 2008, and was produced by Matt Squire. The album's lead single "I'll Run" was the first song they wrote as a band, which DeLeon describes as a "good representation" of the group and their songs." By February 15, 2008, the song received over 300,000 hits on the band's MySpace page. "One of Those Nights" was released as the album's second single on March 25, 2008. The song features Brendon Urie of Panic! at the Disco and Patrick Stump of Fall Out Boy, which was also co-written by Stump. The video for "One of Those Nights" features members of both Panic! at the Disco and Fall Out Boy. On October 30, they released a music video for their third single "Bounce", through the Fueled by Ramen YouTube page. The song peaked at number 69 on the defunct US Billboard Pop 100 Airplay chart. Whisper War debuted on the US Billboard 200 at number 108, as well as number one on the US Heatseekers Albums chart. As of October 2009, the album's sales stood at 67,000. To date, the album has sold over 100,000 copies in the United States.

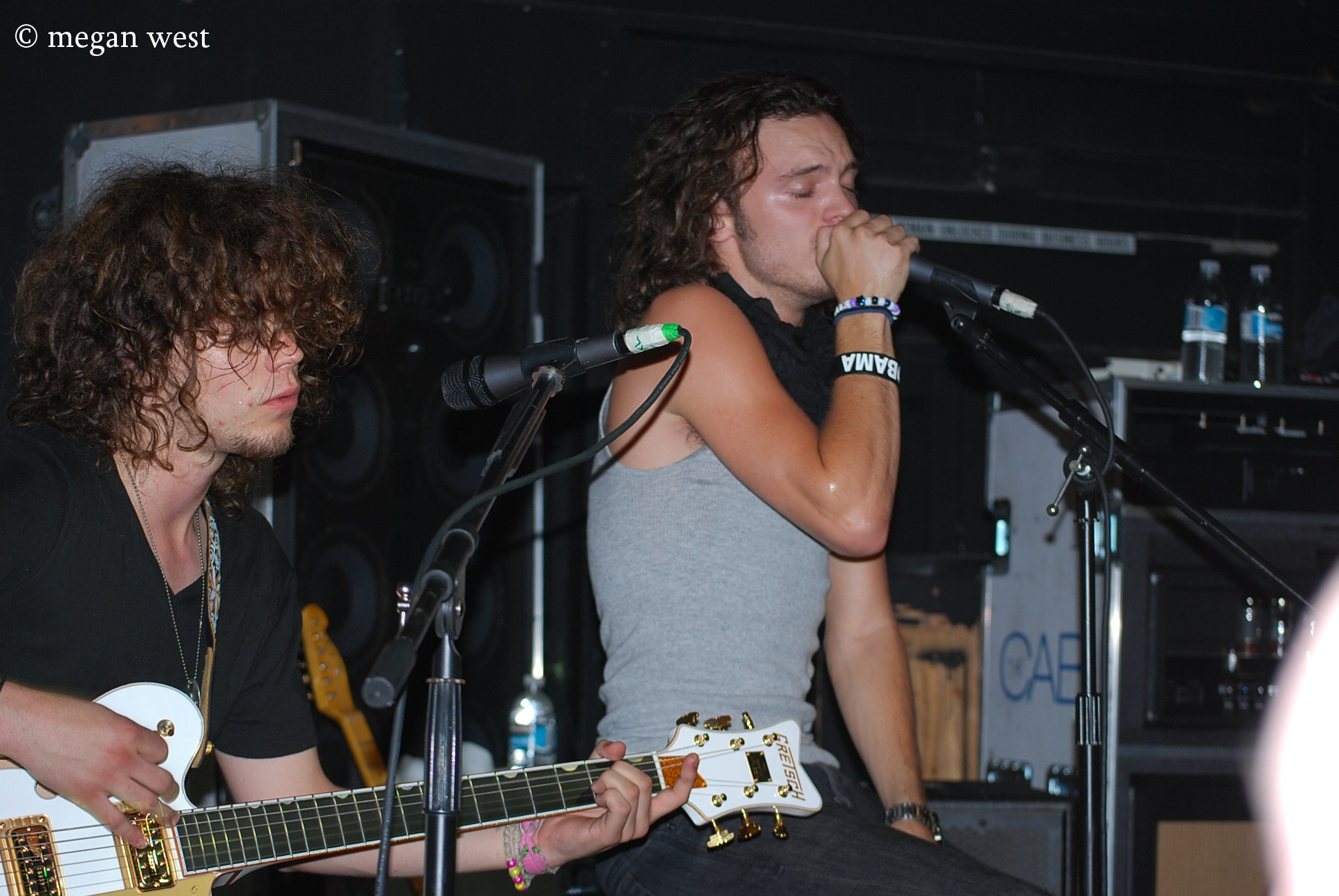
DeLeon and Ian Crawford performing in 2008.

The Cab began the Dance Across the Country Tour with The Hush Sound, Steel Train and The Morning Light on July 7 in Pittsburgh, Pennsylvania. Hey Monday opened for them at The Culture Room in South Florida. The Why So Serious? Tour began in September with support from This Providence, Hey Monday and A Rocket to the Moon. In October, they also joined Panic! at the Disco, Dashboard Confessional, and the Plain White T's on the Rock Band Live tour. Their songs "Bounce" and "One of Those Nights" are featured as downloadable tracks in Rock Band 2.

The Cab appeared on Punk Goes Pop 2, covering Rihanna's "Disturbia". In February and March 2009 the band toured with The Maine, We the Kings, There for Tomorrow and Versaemerge on the Secret Valentine Tour. On May 1, the band performed an entire set dedicated to Queen. The group also performed at the Bamboozle Road Show tour. Shortly after, the band announced their first national headlining tour, called the What Happens in Vegas... tour, with the support of The Secret Handshake, A Rocket to the Moon, Eye Alaska, Anarbor, The Summer Set, and My Favorite Highway. The tour began on June 18 and ended on August 9. The group released their The Lady Luck EP on June 30. The EP peaked at number 14 on the US Heatseekers Albums chart.

On June 1, 2009, DeLeon announced on his blog that guitarist Ian Crawford had decided to leave the band. His decision to leave the group was due to creative differences. For their then-upcoming What Happens in Vegas... tour, The Cab announced that their friend Bryan Dawson would be replacing Ian Crawford. On August 19, 2009, bassist Cash Colligan announced that he would also be leaving the band.

On January 16, 2010, DeLeon announced via Twitter that Dawson had become a father, and later he confirmed his leave from the band. The group, alongside Hey Monday, supported Never Shout Never on the AP Tour from March to May 2010. They were named the "100 Bands You Need to Know in 2010" by Alternative Press alongside those two groups. In April, drummer Alex Johnson confirmed that they were in the process of recording their second album, having "75 to 80 percent" of the record completed. The band performed at the 2010 Warped Tour from June to August 2010. The group performed an exclusive show at the Glass House in Pomona, California, playing Whisper War in its entirety on April 29, 2011.

=== 2011–2012: Symphony Soldier and lineup changes ===
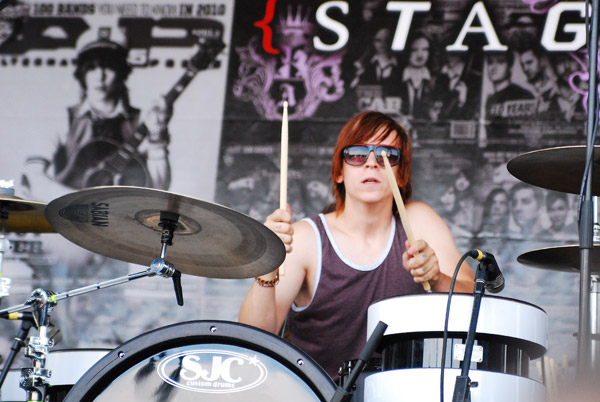
Drummer Alex Johnson performing at Warped Tour, a year before his departure from the band.

On June 22, 2011, The Cab announced that they were departing from their label Fueled by Ramen and Decaydance Records before previewing a 90-second teaser for their second studio album, Symphony Soldier. The first single from the album, "Bad", was released on July 11, via iTunes. The song debuted on Sirius XM Radio. The song peaked at number 29 on the US Adult Pop Airplay chart. The group revealed the album's cover art and track listing on July 19, with pre-orders for the album in the band's webstore featuring eleven packages, ranging from $10 to $9,999. The group also parted ways with their drummer Alex Johnson citing, "he was having a difficult time with things, and we were completely here, as friends and family. Once things started happening and we started talking to him about things, we realized we needed to be friends first before bandmates, you know?."

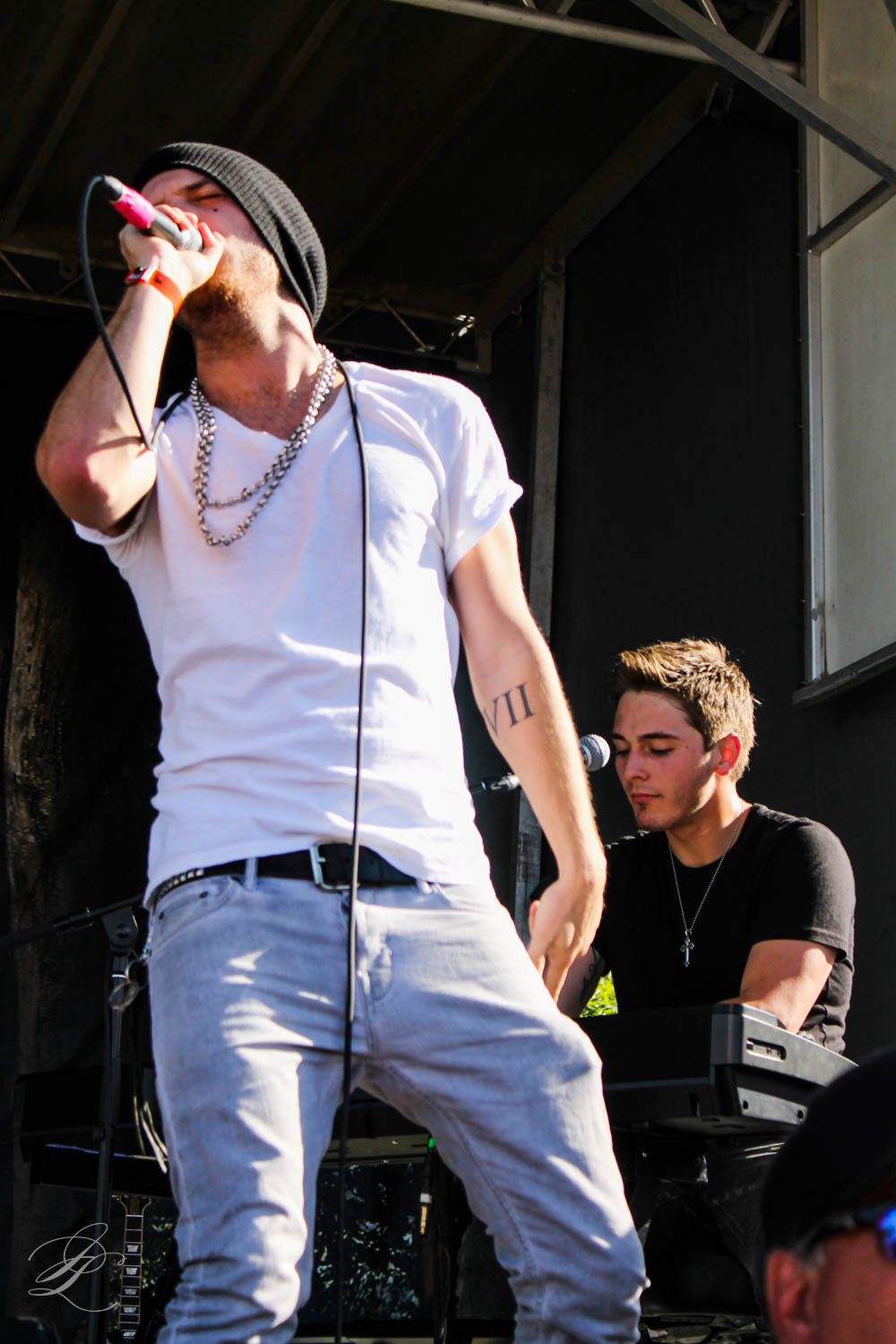
Alex DeLeon and Alex T. Marshall performing in 2012.

Symphony Soldier was released on August 23, 2011. Alex Marshall described the album as everything "we've been through over the past two years." The Cab guitarist alumnus Ian Crawford played guitar for the album. It features several guest artists co-writing, including Martin Johnson, Pete Wentz, Bruno Mars and Adam Levine. The group was previously writing with S*A*M and Sluggo, Rob Knox and Claude Kelly for the album in 2010, however, the group decided to scrap most of those songs as "it was sounding like an American Idol record," according to DeLeon, which was something the band was not going for. He also stated the reason for the album taking a while to be released was due to creative differences with the label and felt that since departing from the label, they could do what they wanted. The album peaked at number 62 on the Billboard 200.

In August 2011, The Cab gained a second guitarist, Frank Sidoris, and drummer, Dave Briggs. They embarked on a US headlining tour for five dates. The band toured with Simple Plan, Forever The Sickest Kids, and Marianas Trench in the fall of 2011. The band also joined Avril Lavigne on her Canadian tour in October 2011. In November 2011, the group released "Angel with a Shotgun" as the second single from the album in Singapore only. They co-headlined the Everything's Fine Symphony Soldier tour during January and February 2012 with The Summer Set, with supporting acts He Is We, Days Difference, and Paradise Fears. On April 10, the group released the music video for "La La". They joined Daytrader on the Zumiez Couch tour in June. The band also co-headlined a tour with Parachute in the summer of 2012.

On June 20, 2012, they announced that they would be supporting Maroon 5 on the Overexposed World Tour, with dates taking place in September and October. That same summer, Sidoris announced his intention to leave the band and join Slash's new band featuring Myles Kennedy and The Conspirators. The band added guitarist and cellist Chantry Johnson as his replacement. The group performed at the Summer Jam Fest on August 4. A music video for "Endlessly" on November 15, and the video features an appearance from actress Hailee Steinfeld.

=== 2012–2015: Cancelled third studio album, Lock Me Up, and hiatus ===
After remaining independent for over a year, on August 31, 2012, The Cab announced that they had signed a record deal with Universal Republic. Writing began for the third album in early June 2012. The group started recording the album in January 2013, posting studio updates. On April 25, 2014, Alex Marshall announced he had parted ways with The Cab via their official Facebook page. On April 28, the group returned and released the single "Lock Me Up". An EP, Lock Me Up, was released on April 29, opting to release an EP instead of a full-length album at the time. According to DeLeon, they had written 120 songs during the album cycle and he hoped to include an additional seven to eight songs on the album. Speaking about the direction the band was heading to, DeLeon described it as leaning "a little darker." The album was expected to be released later in 2014.

On October 31, 2015, Alexander DeLeon announced that he would be releasing a new single, "Guns and Roses", as a solo artist, under the moniker Bohnes, on November 13, 2015.

In an interview in 2017 with All Access, DeLeon confirmed that the band was taking a break as he works as a solo artist. DeLeon hinted that there could be a potential return for The Cab in the future.

=== 2019–present: End of hiatus and Chasing Crowns ===
In April 2019, DeLeon confirmed that the Cab was working on new music. In January 2020, a new song was teased on Twitter along with an announcement of a new album in the works. In April 2024, the band announced that they had finished making the album and teased a new song "Running Late". The group re-issued Whisper War as a vinyl on April 29, for the album's 16-year anniversary. In October 2024, the band announced their comeback as a part of the 2025 When We Were Young Festival lineup. Prior to the announcement, DeLeon reached out to Marhsall and their managers about performing at the festival that was taking place in their hometown, which DeLeon described the moment as "too perfect." Reflecting on the hiatus, Marshall said, "We had been touring extensively [...] And I think for both of us, we had been road dogs for so long that we were burned out. 'We need to take a pause on this for a bit'."

On April 29, 2025, the group teased new music once again. On May 29, 2025, the group announced two show dates: Singapore on December 10, and at Playback Music Festival in the Philippines on December 13. The band held their "first jam session" ahead of their performance at the 2025 When We Were Young Festival, with bassist Joey Thunder and drummer Dave Briggs returning to round out the line-up. On September 12, the group announced their EP titled Road to Reign: A Prelude, released on September 26. According to DeLeon, the EP was supposed to be "a taste of what's to come."

In February 2026, the band announced their third studio album, Chasing Crowns, released on April 24, 2026, with "Locked and Loaded" revealed as its lead single. They also announced the Back From the Dead Tour with support from Jady, Carr, and Paradise Fears, scheduled for May and June 2026. The album marked the band's first full release in nearly 12 years following the Lock Me Up EP.

== Musical style and influences ==
The Cab's musical style has been described as pop rock, pop punk, alternative rock, emo pop, power pop, and pop. The group cites influences from Blink-182, Sum 41, Taking Back Sunday and The Bled.

The group's debut studio album Whisper War is described as power pop, pop rock and pop punk. Music reviewer Kaj Roth of Melodic compared the album's sound to the likes of Maroon 5 and Simple Plan. The Lady Luck EP sees the band experimenting with a pop/R&B sound. Their second studio album Symphony Soldier is described as pop rock and power pop. The band's EP Lock Me Up departed from the band's previous pop-punk and alternative rock sound, in favor of pop, R&B and electropop.

== Band members ==
Current

- Alexander DeLeon – lead vocals, piano (2004–2015, 2019–present)
- Alex T. Marshall – keyboards, rhythm guitar, backing vocals (2005–2014, 2019–present)
- Joey Thunder – bass (2009–2015, 2025–present)
- Dave Briggs – drums, percussion (2011–2015, 2025–present)
- Chantry Johnson – lead guitar, backing vocals, cello (2012–2015, 2025–present)

Former

- Alex Johnson – drums, percussion, backing vocals (2005–2011)
- Cash Colligan – bass, backing vocals (2004–2009)
- Paul Garcia – lead guitar (2004–2007)
- Ian Crawford – lead guitar, backing vocals (2007–2009)
- Bryan Dawson – lead guitar (2009–2010)
- Charles Henry – rhythm and lead guitar (2010–2011)
- Frank Sidoris – rhythm and lead guitar (2011–2012)

== Discography ==
=== Studio albums ===
| Title | Album details | Peak chart positions | | | | Sales |
| Title | Album details | US | US Indie | US Rock | JPN | Sales |
|---|---|---|---|---|---|---|
| Whisper War | Released: April 29, 2008; Label: Decaydance, Fueled by Ramen; Format: Digital download, CD | 108 | — | — | 95 | US: 100,000 |
| Symphony Soldier | Released: August 23, 2011; Label: Independent; Format: Digital download, CD | 62 | 6 | 9 | — | |
| Chasing Crowns | Released: April 24, 2026; Label: The Cab Records; Format: Digital download, Vinyl | — | — | — | — | |
"—" denotes a release that did not chart or was not released in that territory.

=== Extended plays ===
List of extended plays
| Title | EP details | Peak chart positions | |
| Title | EP details | US | US Heat |
|---|---|---|---|
| Drunk Love | Released: 2006; Label: Independent; Formats: CD, digital download | — | — |
| Glitz and Glamour | Released: 2006; Label: Independent; Formats: CD, digital download | — | — |
| The Lady Luck EP | Released: June 30, 2009; Label: Decaydance, Fueled by Ramen; Formats: CD, digital download | — | 14 |
| Lock Me Up | Released: April 29, 2014; Label: Republic; Format: CD, digital download | 44 | — |
| Road to Reign: A Prelude | Released: September 26, 2025; Label: The Cab Records; Format: Digital download, streaming | — | — |
"—" denotes a release that did not chart.

=== Singles ===
List of singles with selected chart positions and certifications
| Title | Year | Peak chart positions | | | Certifications | Album |
| Title | Year | US Adult | US Pop 100 | SGP | Certifications | Album |
|---|---|---|---|---|---|---|
| "I'll Run" | 2008 | — | — | — | | Whisper War |
| "One of Those Nights" | 2008 | — | — | — | | Whisper War |
| "Bounce" | 2008 | — | 69 | 11 | | Whisper War |
| "Bad" | 2011 | 29 | — | 8 | | Symphony Soldier |
| "Angel with a Shotgun" | 2011 | — | — | 3 | RIAA: Gold | Symphony Soldier |
| "La La" | 2012 | — | — | 1 | | Symphony Soldier |
| "Endlessly" | 2012 | — | — | — | | Symphony Soldier |
| "Lock Me Up" | 2014 | — | — | — | | Lock Me Up |
| "Locked and Loaded" | 2026 | — | — | — | | Chasing Crowns |
| "Back From the Dead" | 2026 | — | — | — | | Chasing Crowns |
| "Sweet Kerosene" | 2026 | — | — | — | | Chasing Crowns |
"—" denotes a single that did not chart or was not released in that territory.
