= Summerhouse =

A summer house (also spelt summerhouse) is a small covered building in a garden, mostly used in the summer.

Summerhouse or summer house may also refer to:

== Places ==
- Summerhouse, County Durham, England
- Summerhouse, a brick structure located on the United States Capitol grounds
- Summerhouse Hill, Folkestone Downs, Kent, England
- Derby Summer House, building in Danvers, Massachusetts, United States
- Summerhouse, a fictional estate, setting of British crime drama, Top Boy

== Music ==
- "The Summerhouse", a song by the band The Divine Comedy
- Summer House (album), a 2010 album by Gold Motel
- The Summer House Sessions, a 2021 album by Don Cherry

== Film and television ==
- The Summer House, a 2018 French drama
- Summer House (2006 TV series), American sports TV series
- Summer House (2017 TV series), American reality TV series
- Summer House: Martha's Vineyard, American reality TV series
- "The Summer House" (Dirty Sexy Money), a 2008 television episode

== Video games ==
- Summerhouse (video game), a sandbox city building video game
