= Hush sound =

Hush sound may refer to:

- Shh, a sound requesting silence
- The Hush Sound, an American indie pop band
