= Gold Motel =

American, Chicago-based project

- Origin: Chicago, Illinois, United States
- Genres: Indie pop, alternative rock, indie rock, jangle pop
- Years active: 2009–2011
- Label: Good As Gold Records
- Members: Greta Morgan; Dan Duszynski; Eric Hehr; Matt Minx; Adam Coldhouse

Gold Motel is an American, Chicago-based project, featuring singer Greta Morgan of The Hush Sound. The band consists of Morgan (vocals, keys, songs), Eric Hehr (guitar, songs), Dan Duszynski (guitar, vocals, songs), and features Matt Minx (bass) and Adam Coldhouse (drums) on their studio releases.

== History ==
After The Hush Sound went on hiatus, Morgan moved from Chicago to Los Angeles looking for inspiration. There, she soaked up the Southern California music scene, going to five or six concerts a week. Morgan began writing nostalgic, summery music inspired by her time in California, which would eventually be the songs for Gold Motel. Upon her return to Chicago, Morgan started recording songs with friend Dan Duszynski of Chicago band This is Me Smiling, which led to the recording of Gold Motel's first single, "Perfect in My Mind". Morgan and Duszynski were then joined by Matt Minx and Adam Coldhouse, both from This is Me Smiling, and Eric Hehr formerly of Chicago bands, The Villains of Verona and The Yearbooks. The band worked as a complete unit to finish the rest of the songs that would come to make up their first album, Summer House.

In an interview with SPIN.com, Hehr talked about the inspiration for Summer House's lead single, "Safe In LA," which was a song he wrote prior to joining Gold Motel: "Hehr wrote "Safe in L.A." before he joined Gold Motel, while enduring wintertime in Chicago. "I was kind of bummed out, living in dreary Chicago, and my friends were in L.A., so I wrote the song as a love letter to California, romanticizing about the lifestyle I presumed they were living out there," he tells SPIN.com. Hehr brought the song to his new bandmates, and, to use Morgan's term, they "Gold Motel-ified" it, changing the lyrics a bit and imbuing the soulful, '60s pop that surges through the entire album. "We made it a little more bouncy, sweeter, and softer than the other version," Morgan says. Adds Hehr: "Everyone in the band loves Motown, and I think you hear that, too."

The band decided on the name Gold Motel after pulling words out of a hat.

Gold Motel's first show ever was at the Beat Kitchen in Chicago with Secret Colours on December 22, 2009, before a sold-out crowd. In January 2010, Gold Motel opened for Butch Walker during his residency at Schuba's in Chicago. Since then, Gold Motel has toured across the United States with bands like Family of the Year, Skybox, Mark Rose, hellogoodbye, and Steel Train. Gold Motel played at South By Southwest and Lollapalooza in 2011 and in June 2011, Gold Motel toured the UK with hellogoodbye.

In August 2011, Gold Motel released a new single called "Leave You in Love", which appeared on the band's self-titled album. The song was written by Hehr and Morgan, who took a collection of Hehr's unused lyrics and pieced them together to form the song. In an interview with The Total Scene, Morgan describes the writing process: "Usually, one of us brings a skeletal sketch and then we arrange and record together. For example, Eric brought "These Sore Eyes" with lyrics, melody, chords. I brought "Brand New Kind of Blue" in the same way – with lyrics, melody, chords, and we just arranged together. For a handful of the songs, Eric and I sat down and wrote lyrics together. "Leave You in Love", for example, is an amalgam of a handful of free-write lyrics he had laying around that I then organized and added to."

=== Gold Motel EP ===
The five-song Gold Motel EP was released on December 15, 2009. The first single off the EP was "Perfect in My Mind", which was also the band's first music video directed by Eddie O'Keefe.

No.	Title	Length
1.	"Perfect in My Mind"	3:14
2.	"Make Me Stay"	3:19
3.	"The Cruel One"	2:51
4.	"Who Will I Be Tonight?"	2:17
5.	"Don't Send The Searchlights"	2:50

=== Summer House ===
Summer House is Gold Motel's first full-length album and was released on June 1, 2010. The album features ten songs which includes five new songs in addition to the five songs from the EP. Gold Motel premiered their music video for “We’re on the Run” on Spinner.com on April 27, 2010. The band celebrated Summer House at a record release show at Lincoln Hall in Chicago, Illinois, on June 11, 2010. On July 1, 2010, Gold Motel premiered their music video for "Safe in LA" on Spin Magazine's website. The song "Summer House" was used in one of Crayola's commercials. "Perfect in My Mind" was also used in a Labello commercial.

=== Talking Fiction ===
Talking Fiction is Gold Motel's 7-inch, which was released in November 2010. It includes the songs "Cold Shoulders" and "Slow Emergency". The band premiered the music video for "Cold Shoulders" on Magnet's website.

=== Gold Motel (CD) ===
Gold Motel released a self-titled sophomore album in July 2012. This was their second full-length album. The summer feel of the previous releases was continued, particularly with earlier songs in the album, such as "Brand New Kind Of Blue", whereas "Cold Shoulders" has a much heavier tone. Both this track and "Slow Emergency" were also present in Talking Fiction.

No.	Title	Length
1.	"Brand New Kind Of Blue"
2.	"These Sore Eyes"
3.	"Musicians"
4.	"In Broad Daylight"
5.	"Slow Emergency"
6.	"Cold Shoulders"
7.	"Your Own Ghost"
8.	"Always One Step Ahead"
9.	"Counter Clockwise"
10.	"At Least We Tried"
11.	"Santa Cruz"
12.	"Leave You In Love"

== Discography ==
=== Albums ===
Title	Release date
Gold Motel EP	December 15, 2009
Summer House	June 1, 2010
Talking Fiction 7"	November 30, 2010
Gold Motel	July 3, 2012

=== Singles ===
Title	Release date	Album
"Perfect in My Mind"	2009	Gold Motel EP
"We're on the Run"	2010	Summer House
"Safe in LA"	2010	Summer House
"Cold Shoulders"	2011	Talking Fiction
"Leave You in Love"	2011	Gold Motel
