= Summer House (album) =

Studio album by Gold Motel
- Released: June 1, 2010
- Recorded: 2010
- Venue: Dandy Sounds
- Genre: Indie rock
- Length: 29:55
- Label: Good As Gold Records
- Producer: Dan Duszynski

Gold Motel chronology
Gold Motel EP (2009)	Summer House (2010)	Gold Motel (2012)

Singles from Summer House
- 1. "We're on the Run" Released: 2010; 2. "Safe in LA" Released: 2010

Professional ratings
Review scores
Source	Rating
Mezzic	5.3/10
Sputnikmusic	4/5 stars

Summer House is the debut studio album by Gold Motel, released on June 1, 2010 on Good As Gold Records.

== Track listing ==
No.	Title	Length
1.	"We're on the Run"	2:58
2.	"Perfect in My Mind"	3:14
3.	"Safe in L.A."	3:07
4.	"Stealing the Moonlight"	3:24
5.	"Fireworks After Midnight"	2:46
6.	"Don't Send the Searchlights"	2:52
7.	"Make Me Stay"	3:17
8.	"The Cruel One"	2:50
9.	"Who Will I Be Tonight?"	2:16
10.	"Summer House"	3:18
11.	"Sunshine All Night" (Bonus Track)	3:34
12.	"Safe in L.A. (Demo)" (Bonus Track)	2:53
13.	"Summer House (Greta Acoustic Demo)" (Bonus Track)	2:00
14.	"Fireworks After Midnight (Greta's Instrumental Theme)" (Bonus Track)	2:24
