= Greta Morgan =

American musician (born 1988)

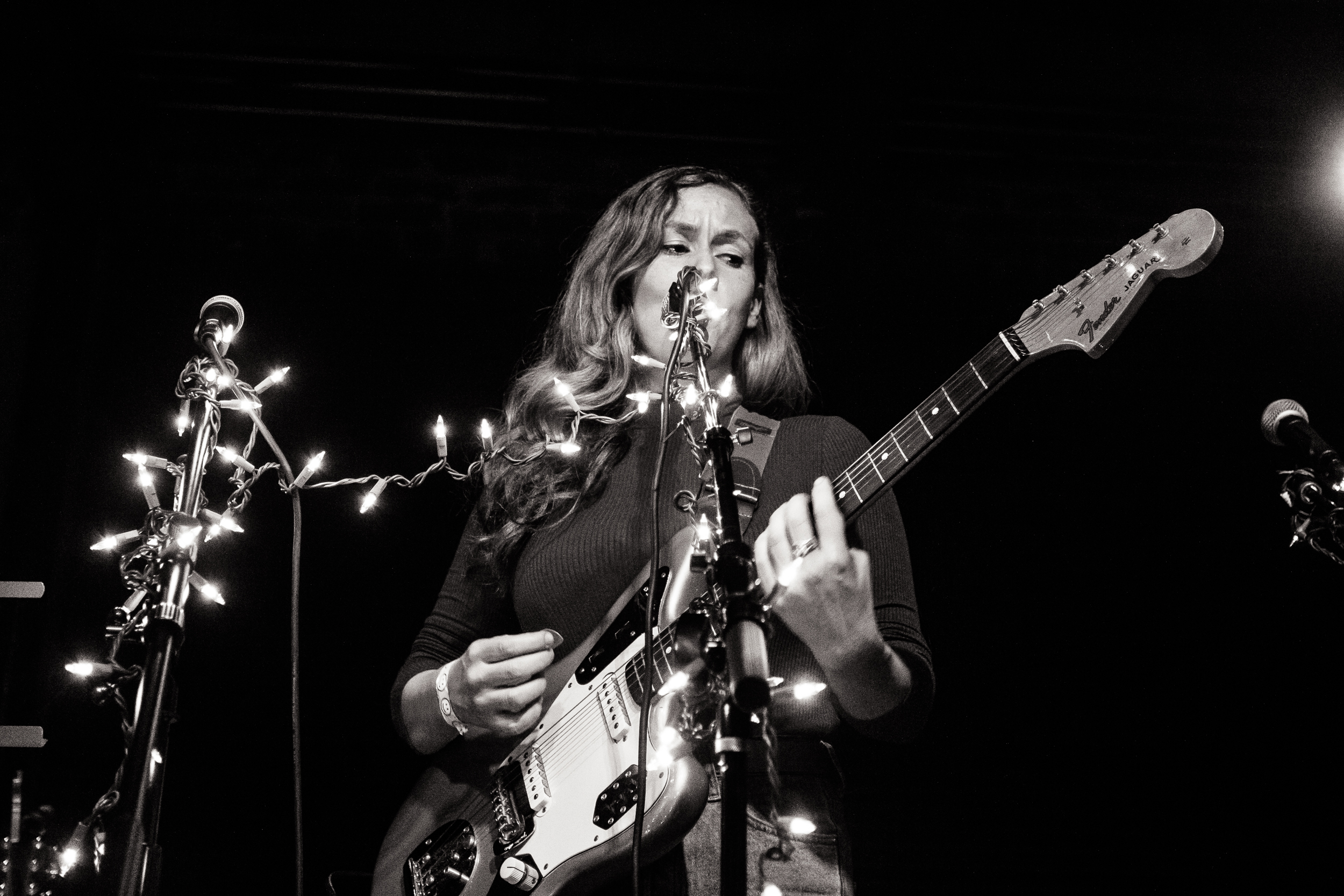
- Morgan performing in Los Angeles in 2016

Background information
- Also known as: Greta Salpeter
- Born: February 12, 1988 (age 38)
- Origin: Oak Brook, Illinois
- Instruments: Vocals; keyboards; guitar; drums
- Labels: Fueled by Ramen, Decaydance, Autumn Tone

Greta Morgan Salpeter (born February 12, 1988) is an American singer-songwriter and musician based in Los Angeles, California. Her career began in 2004 as the singer and pianist of the Chicago-based band the Hush Sound. She later formed the band Gold Motel, whose debut album was released on June 1, 2010. Since 2014, she has performed under the name Springtime Carnivore and has released two albums.

== Personal life ==
She has been diagnosed with Spasmodic dysphonia in 2020 In 2025, she published a memoir, The Lost Voice, in which she chronicles how COVID-19 left her unable to sing.

== Music career ==
Morgan began learning piano at a young age, studying classical music. She first met Bob Morris, guitarist/vocalist in 2001. The two started playing together and created the Hush Sound, later recruiting Chris Faller on bass and Darren Wilson on drums. She was 16 when she began touring with the Hush Sound.

In 2009, Morgan began recording material with the band Gold Motel.

Together with La Sera's Katy Goodman, Morgan formed the duo Books of Love; they released the song "Space Time" in 2013.

In 2012, Morgan began working on a solo project called Springtime Carnivore and recorded a six-track EP, which was self-released in September of that year. In November 2014, she released a self-titled album through Autumn Tone Records. It was followed by a tour in early 2015 as support to the Dodos.

In early 2016, Morgan again got together with Goodman and recorded a number of punk rock covers with 1960s pop arrangements. It was released in August 2016 as Take It, It's Yours through Polyvinyl, and described by Pitchfork as "one of the comfiest cover-sets in recent memory". On October 7, 2016, her project Springtime Carnivore released their second album, Midnight Room.

In 2018, Morgan joined the new live line-up of Vampire Weekend on keyboards, guitar and vocals. Morgan is also a distant relative of Vampire Weekend vocalist Ezra Koenig.

As well as being a vocalist and pianist, Morgan has also been known to play the guitar, bass guitar, and drums.

== Discography ==
=== Albums ===
==== As Springtime Carnivore ====
- Midnight Room (2016)
- Springtime Carnivore (2014)

==== With Katy Goodman ====
- Take It, It's Yours (2016)
- "Space Time" as Books of Love (2013)

==== With Gold Motel ====
- Gold Motel (2012)
- Summer House (2010)

==== With The Hush Sound ====
- Tidal Wave (2013)
- Forty Five (2013)
- Goodbye Blues (2008)
- Like Vines (2006)
- So Sudden (2005)
