= Whisper War =

Studio album by the Cab
- Released: April 29, 2008
- Recorded: October 2007
- Studio: Red Bull Studios (Santa Monica)
- Genre: Pop rock; pop punk; alternative rock; power pop
- Length: 44:18
- Label: Decaydance; Fueled by Ramen
- Producer: Matt Squire; Patrick Stump

The Cab chronology
Glitz and Glamour (2006)	Whisper War (2008)	The Lady Luck (2009)

Singles from Whisper War
- 1. "I'll Run" Released: January 9, 2008; 2. "One of Those Nights" Released: March 25, 2008; 3. "Bounce" Released: October 30, 2008

Whisper War is the debut studio album by American rock band the Cab. It was released on April 29, 2008, by Fueled by Ramen and Decaydance Records. The album is a pop rock, pop-punk, alternative rock, and power pop record. It was recorded in October 2007, at Red Bull Studios, based in Santa Monica, California. It was produced by Matt Squire and Patrick Stump of Fall Out Boy, who also provides vocals on "Bounce", "One of Those Nights", "I'm a Wonder" and sings backing vocals on other songs.

Upon its release, the album was positively received by music critics, who praised the album's production and sound. Commercially, the album charted at number 108 on the US Billboard 200 and peaked at the top of the Heatseekers Albums chart in that same country. The album would also chart in Japan. Three singles were released to promote the album: "I'll Run", "One of Those Nights", and "Bounce". In 2024, the album was re-released to commemorate the band's 16th anniversary.

== Background and production ==
Band members Alexander DeLeon and Cash Colligan first began playing music together at Liberty High School and recorded demos which they put up on their MySpace page. After giving a demo to Jon Walker and Spencer Smith of Panic! at the Disco who was impressed with the band, he helped them sign to Decaydance Records and Fueled by Ramen in May 2007. The group recruited keyboardist Alex T. Marshall, drummer Alex Johnson and lead guitarist Ian Crawford.

Recording for the album began in the fall of 2007, at Red Bull Studios in Santa Monica. "I'll Run" was the first song they wrote as a band, which DeLeon describes as a "good representation" of the group and their songs." However, DeLeon stated that each track on the album would be different from one another, giving a diverse feel. The album was produced by Matt Squire. Describing the sound, DeLeon said that they wanted to balance rock and R&B music and explained the album's name, "There has to be the beautiful and the ugly, the ying and the yang, the black and the white, so to have something like a whisper that is very soft, delicate and fragile, and have war, which is extreme and harsh – they kind of balance each other."

The record features Brendon Urie of Panic! at the Disco and Patrick Stump of Fall Out Boy on the first single off the album, "One of Those Nights", which was co-written by Stump. The home videos for "I'll Run" and "One of Those Nights" feature members of Panic! at the Disco, while the latter also features Pete Wentz and Patrick Stump of Fall Out Boy. The song "Bounce" is available through free download and ships as a download code with a new copy of Rock Band 2. Also, "One of Those Nights" is featured as a playable song via an online purchase for the music game Rock Band.

== Release and promotion ==
The group posted a demo of "I'll Run" to their MySpace shortly after they were signed to Fueled by Ramen/Decaydance Records. It was also announced that a full-length studio album would be released later in 2007. "I'll Run" was released as the album's lead single on January 9, 2008, which received over 300,000 hits on the band's MySpace page. "One of Those Nights" was released as the album's second single on March 25. Whisper War was officially released on April 29. The following day, the music video for "One of Those Nights" was released, which garnered heavy rotation on MTV. The official music video for "I'll Run" premiered on August 8, via FNMTV. On October 30, they released a music video for their third single "Bounce", through the Fueled by Ramen YouTube page. On January 27, 2009, limited copies of Whisper War was released as a vinyl. The group re-issued the album as a vinyl again on April 29, 2024, for the album's 16 year anniversary.

== Critical reception ==
Professional ratings
Review scores
Source	Rating
AllMusic	3/5 stars
Melodic	4/5 stars

Whisper War was met with generally positive reviews from music critics. Katherine Fulton of AllMusic stated, "their debut captures a group of musicians just barely out of high school, so it's understandable that the Cab would work with what's familiar -- and Whisper War does show that they have enough talent to branch out and explore new sounds, even if they're not quite ready to do so here." She primarily praised the track "That '70s Song" that "sets the Cab apart, and also what makes Whisper War a good start for the young band." Kaj Roth of Melodic praised the album's production and the songs hooks, describing the record as "a more rocking Maroon 5 or why not a soulful Simple Plan."

In retrospect, Las Vegas Review-Journal recalled it as "an album of R&B-inflected, love-drunk pop rock with ringing, U2-esque guitars set against DeLeon's doe-eyed, ever-earnest delivery."

== Commercial performance ==
On May 7, 2008, Whisper War debuted at number 108 on the US Billboard 200 and at number 1 on the Billboard Top Heatseekers chart where it stayed on for 17 weeks. The song "Bounce" reached number 69 on the defunct Pop 100 airplay chart. By October 2009, the album's sales stood at 67,000 copies. The album would also chart at number 95 on the Top Album Sales chart in Japan. As of October 2025, the album sold over 100,000 copies.

== Track listing ==
All tracks are written by Alex DeLeon and The Cab, with additional writers noted.

No.	Title	Writer(s)	Length
1.	"One of Those Nights"	Patrick Stump	3:49
2.	"Bounce"		3:35
3.	"I'll Run"		3:46
4.	"High Hopes in Velvet Ropes"	Matt Squire	3:22
5.	"That '70s Song"	Stump	3:33
6.	"Take My Hand"	Brian Lee	3:27
7.	"Risky Business"		3:35
8.	"I'm a Wonder"	Stump	3:33
9.	"Zzzzz"	Sam Hollander; Dave Katz	3:39
10.	"Vegas Skies"	Squire	4:38
11.	"Can You Keep a Secret?"	Squire	3:51
12.	"This City Is Contagious"	Squire	3:37

Japanese bonus track
No.	Title	Length
13.	"Diamonds Are Forever"	3:12

== Personnel ==
Credits adapted from album's liner notes.

The Cab

- Alex DeLeon – vocals
- Cash Colligan – bass guitar
- Alex Johnson – drums
- Alex Marshall – piano, guitar
- Ian Crawford – guitar

Additional musicians

- Patrick Vaughn Stump – additional instrumentation (1, 2, 8), additional vocals (1, 2, 8)
- Brendon Urie – additional vocals (1)
- George DeLeon – additional vocals (5)

Technical personnel

- Matt Squire – producer and engineer (1–7, 9–12), mixing (10)
- Patrick Vaughn Stump – producer (8), additional production (1, 2)
- Eric Stenman – engineer (1–7, 9–12)
- Bill Lefler – engineer (8), additional engineering (1, 2)
- Machine – mixing
- Scott Hull – mastering

== Charts ==
Chart performance for Whisper War
Chart (2008)	Peak position
Japan Top Album Sales (Billboard Japan)	95
US Billboard 200	108
US Heatseekers Albums (Billboard)	1

== Release history ==
Release dates and formats for Whisper War
Region	Date	Format	Label	Ref.
United States	April 29, 2008	CD; digital download	Decaydance/Fueled by Ramen	
Japan	August 27, 2008	CD	Decaydance/Fueled by Ramen	
