= The Hush Sound =

American indie pop band

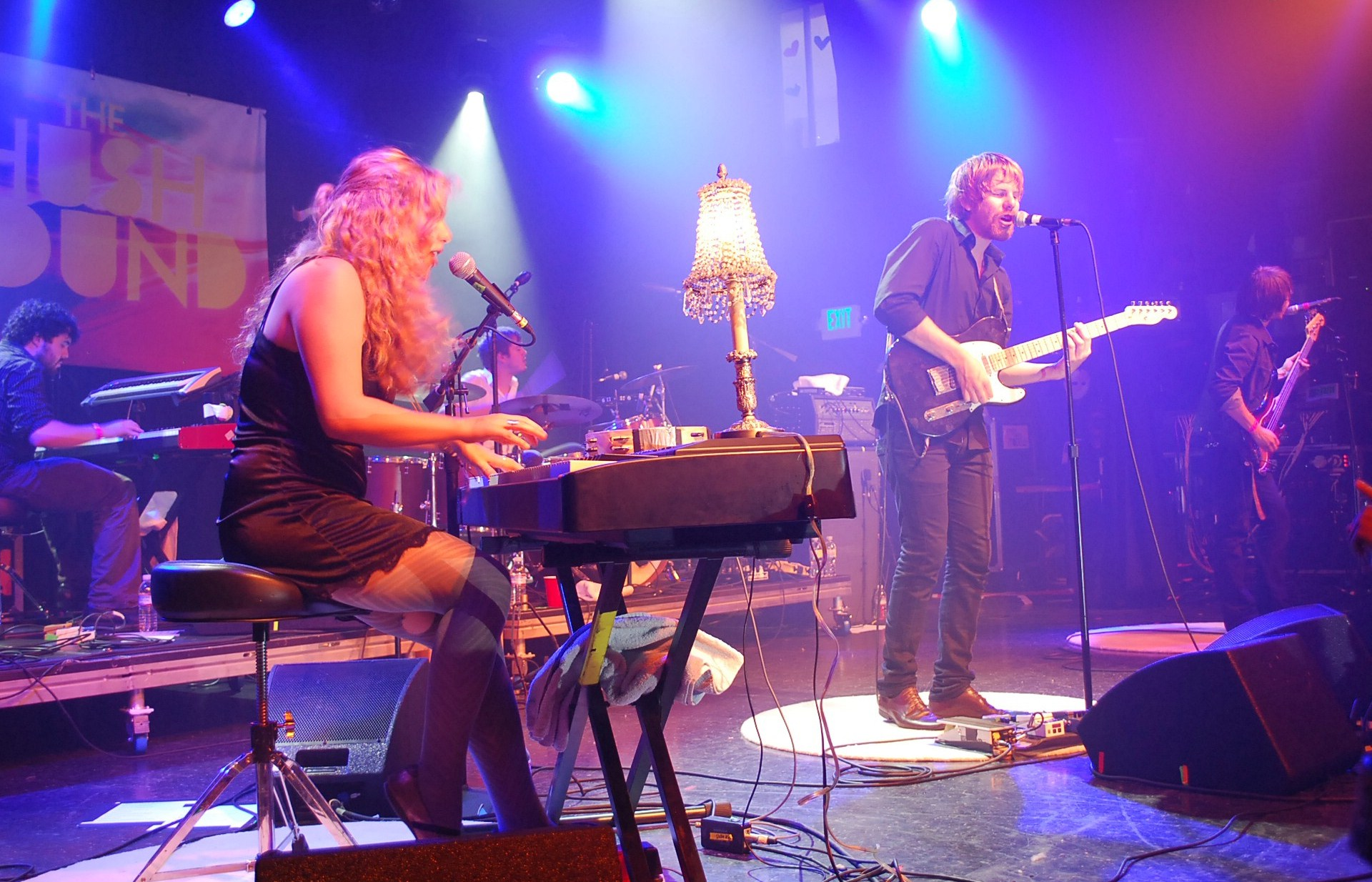
- The Hush Sound performing in August 2008

Background information
- Origin: Urbana, Illinois, United States
- Genres: Indie pop; jangle pop; alternative rock
- Years active: 2004–2008; 2012–2017
- Labels: LAB; Pipe & Hat; Decaydance; Fueled by Ramen
- Members: Bob Morris; Darren Wilson; Greta Salpeter; Chris Faller
- Past members: Mike Leblanc; Tiane Duval

The Hush Sound was an American indie pop band from Chicago, Illinois, United States. Initially named "The Hush," the band changed its name to "The Hush Sound" to avoid being confused with a rapper with the same name. The band consisted of Bob Morris (vocals and guitar), Chris Faller (bass guitar and vocals), Darren Wilson (drums, percussion and vocals), and Greta Salpeter (vocals and piano). Mike Leblanc (bass guitar) temporarily replaced Faller when he left the band for a few months in 2008.

In 2005, the band released their debut studio album, So Sudden, independently, which was rereleased through Decaydance Records and Fueled by Ramen. Their second studio album, Like Vines, was released in 2006 under the independent record label, Fueled by Ramen. Their third album, Goodbye Blues, was recorded in October and November 2007 in Los Angeles and was released March 18, 2008.

The Hush Sound was on hiatus from 2008 to 2012. They played shows together sporadically during this period. In 2013, the band released the EP, "Forty Five". The band toured throughout 2016 and 2017 to celebrate the ten-year anniversary of their sophomore album and has since been inactive.

== History ==
=== 2004–2005: Formation and So Sudden ===
The Hush Sound was founded by Greta Salpeter and Bob Morris. The two met when Greta was in 7th grade and Bob was in 10th. Bob had always been a player and performer of rock music, whereas Greta was a classical pianist. The band formed in late 2004/early 2005, while writing songs they felt worthy of publication. During their early years in the Chicago community of Pilsen, they would hold practice in Throop Park and play live for the Razas. In their early work, the band dealt mostly with acoustic music. Once the band decided that a piano and guitar were not enough for the sound it wished to achieve, the band members started searching for a drummer and a bass player willing to join their band. They soon recruited bassist Chris Faller and drummer Darren Wilson who had played in a previous band together, "Until Sundown."

By the end of March 2005, The Hush Sound took its music to producer Brian Zieske who helped them realize their vision for their debut full-length album. The album was tracked at Gallery of Carpet Recording in Villa Park, Illinois. They named the album So Sudden; a reflection on how quickly things were moving for the band. They released their first album with no label support at the time, but nevertheless sold 300 CDs in two nights.

Five months later, the band began performing live. Shortly thereafter, the group gained the attention of Fall Out Boy’s Pete Wentz. On the day they were streaming So Sudden on purevolume, Ryan Ross formerly of Panic! at the Disco discovered their page and passed it along to Pete Wentz. Wentz, liking what he heard, sent The Hush Sound an email, stating that he was interested in signing them to his Decaydance Records label.

The Hush Sound was soon signed to Decaydance Records (now known as DCD2 records). So Sudden was re-released under that label, and the band immersed itself in writing for its second album.

=== 2006–2008: Like Vines and Goodbye Blues ===
Like Vines was recorded in March 2006 over three weeks with producer Sean O' Keefe and co-producer Patrick Stump of Fall Out Boy.

On March 18, 2008, The Hush Sound released an album entitled Goodbye Blues. They recorded the album with producer Kevin Augunas, whom they met while on the SXSW tour. Morris stated on the band's official website that the band was "extremely impressed" with the "positive force" of Augunas. The album was released on March 18. The song "Medicine Man" can be heard in commercials for the TV series Grey's Anatomy and the TV series House while the song "Hurricane" can be heard in commercials for The Young and the Restless. The song "Honey" was featured in the episode "All About Appearances" on the television series Privileged.

You can expect some songs with balls... some songs of quirk... and some groovy tunesies. — Bob Morris

On October 23, 2008, it was announced on the band's official MySpace that bassist Chris Faller had chosen to leave the band in order to pursue other musical interests, and that Mike LeBlanc, who had toured with them previously on their "Dance Across the Country Tour," would temporarily be playing the bass in Faller's place.

=== 2009–present: Hiatus and reunion ===
In the fall of 2008, The Hush Sound confirmed that they will be taking a hiatus to pursue other careers in music. Greta formed Gold Motel and they released their debut EP in December 2009. Bob announced his band, Stamps. The Hush Sound played a reunion show at Chicago's Metro concert hall on December 26, 2010 and two shows at Bottom Lounge on February 3 and 4, 2012.

The band ended their hiatus and announced a small number of tour dates for fall 2012. They played new songs, two of which were released on March 20, 2013, the day after the last stop on their tour, on an EP called "Forty Five". One of the songs, "Not a Stranger," was released via The Onion's "AV Club."

In 2016, they embarked on another reunion tour branded as their "1000 Year Anniversary Tour". The tour celebrated the 10th anniversary of the release of Like Vines and their sets began with a full play-through of the album. Though no official breakup statement was released, the band has been inactive ever since. Between 2015 and 2017, Morris worked on his solo project called Le Swish. Morris was also the bassist in the California supergroup Debate Team with OneRepublic guitarist Drew Brown, OK Go drummer Dan Konopka and vocalist Ryan McNeill. Debate Team's debut EP, entitled Wins Again, was released independently in January 2011.

== Tours ==
The band's first major tour was the 2006 "Black Clouds and Underdogs" spring arena tour with headliners Fall Out Boy and The All-American Rejects, and supporting acts Hawthorne Heights and From First to Last. Later that year on June 6, 2006, their second full-length album Like Vines was released. In May 2006 the band went on tour with Fall Out Boy and The Academy Is... in the UK. In support of the new record, the band went on a summer tour with label mates Panic! at the Disco. The band took a month-long break before beginning another tour with Jack's Mannequin, Copeland, and Daphne Loves Derby. Their final tour of the year took place in November, when the group embarked on their first headlining tour. They were supported by opening acts This Providence, This Is Me Smiling, and Murder By Death.

On March 7, 2007 The Hush Sound began a co-headline tour with Straylight Run, supported by Spitalfield and Pablo. The Hush Sound also toured with Boys Like Girls and headliner Hellogoodbye. Destinations included the Wiltern in Los Angeles, The Warfield in San Francisco, and other cities and venues. They have also played with Plain White T's at the DuPage County Fair in Illinois on July 26. During the load in for this show, a stagehand nearly had a hernia trying to impress Greta. On August 12, 2007 they began a co-headlining tour with Rooney and guest Hello Stranger. On December 27, 2007, The Hush Sound played as a supporting act at "A Very Ludo Christmas 2007", other bands that played were Nothing Still, Quietdrive and the headliners of the night, Ludo.

The Hush Sound headlined a tour which ran from February 29 until March 18, 2008. They supported Panic! at the Disco in the Honda Civic Tour along with Motion City Soundtrack and Phantom Planet. The last show of this tour was in Anaheim, California on June 14, 2008. In the summer of 2008, they headlined the "Dance Across the Country Tour," supported by The Cab, The Morning Light, and Steel Train. In the fall of 2008, The Hush Sound toured Japan with The Academy Is... as part of the Decaydance Fest, and Tag This Tour! with OneRepublic, Augustana, and Spill Canvas. They performed a special holiday show at Metro Chicago on December 19, 2008 (also former bassist Chris Faller's last show) with special guests Treaty of Paris and This Is Me Smiling.

The band toured again in fall 2012, with stops mainly on the East Coast and in the Midwest. In early 2013, they began touring throughout the West Coast, beginning at the Troubador in Los Angeles, California, on March 3. This tour included a performance at the South by Southwest music festival in Austin, Texas.

== Discography ==
=== Albums ===
Year	Details	Peak chart positions			
Year	Details	US	US Alt.	US Indie	US Rock
2005	So Sudden: Released: October 11, 2005; Label: Decaydance/Fueled by Ramen	—	—	—	—
2006	Like Vines: Released: June 6, 2006; Label: Decaydance/Fueled by Ramen	— (Note: Like Vines did not enter the US Billboard 200, but peaked at number 17 on the US Heatseekers Albums Chart.)	—	27	—
2008	Goodbye Blues: Released: March 18, 2008; Label: Decaydance/Fueled by Ramen	75	16	—	19

=== EPs ===
Year	Details
2013	Forty Five: Released: March 20, 2013; Label: Pipe & Hat

=== Singles ===
Year	Title	Album
2005	"Crawling Towards the Sun"	So Sudden
2006	"We Intertwined"	Like Vines
2006	"Wine Red"	Like Vines
2008	"Honey"	Goodbye Blues
2008	"Medicine Man"	Goodbye Blues
2013	“Tidal Wave”	Tidal Wave - Single

=== Compilations ===
Title	Release date	Label	Song
Snakes on a Plane: The Album	August 15, 2006	New Line Records/Decaydance	"Wine Red" (Tommie Sunshine's Brooklyn Fire Retouch)
