= Daytrader (band) =

American pop punk band

- Origin: Brooklyn, New York, U.S
- Genre: Pop punk
- Years active: 2009–2012 (hiatus)
- Labels: Run for Cover; Rise
- Members: Tym; Gary Cioni; Robert "Queso" Cheeseman; Derrick Flanagin; Matt Mascarenas
- Past members: Mike Weiss; Jon Murray; Pat Schramm

Daytrader was an American pop punk band from Brooklyn, New York.

== History ==
Daytrader began in 2010 with the self-release of a demo. In 2011, Daytrader released their first EP titled Last Days of Rome on Run For Cover Records. In 2012, Daytrader released a split with the band The Jealous Sound. Also in 2012, Daytrader released their first and only full-length album on Rise Records titled Twelve Years.

== Discography ==
Studio albums

- Twelve Years (2012, Rise Records)

EPs

- Last Days of Rome (2011, Run For Cover Records)

Splits

- Daytrader/The Jealous Sound 7"

Demos

- Demo (2010, self-released)
