= Ian Crawford (musician) =

American musician and vocalist

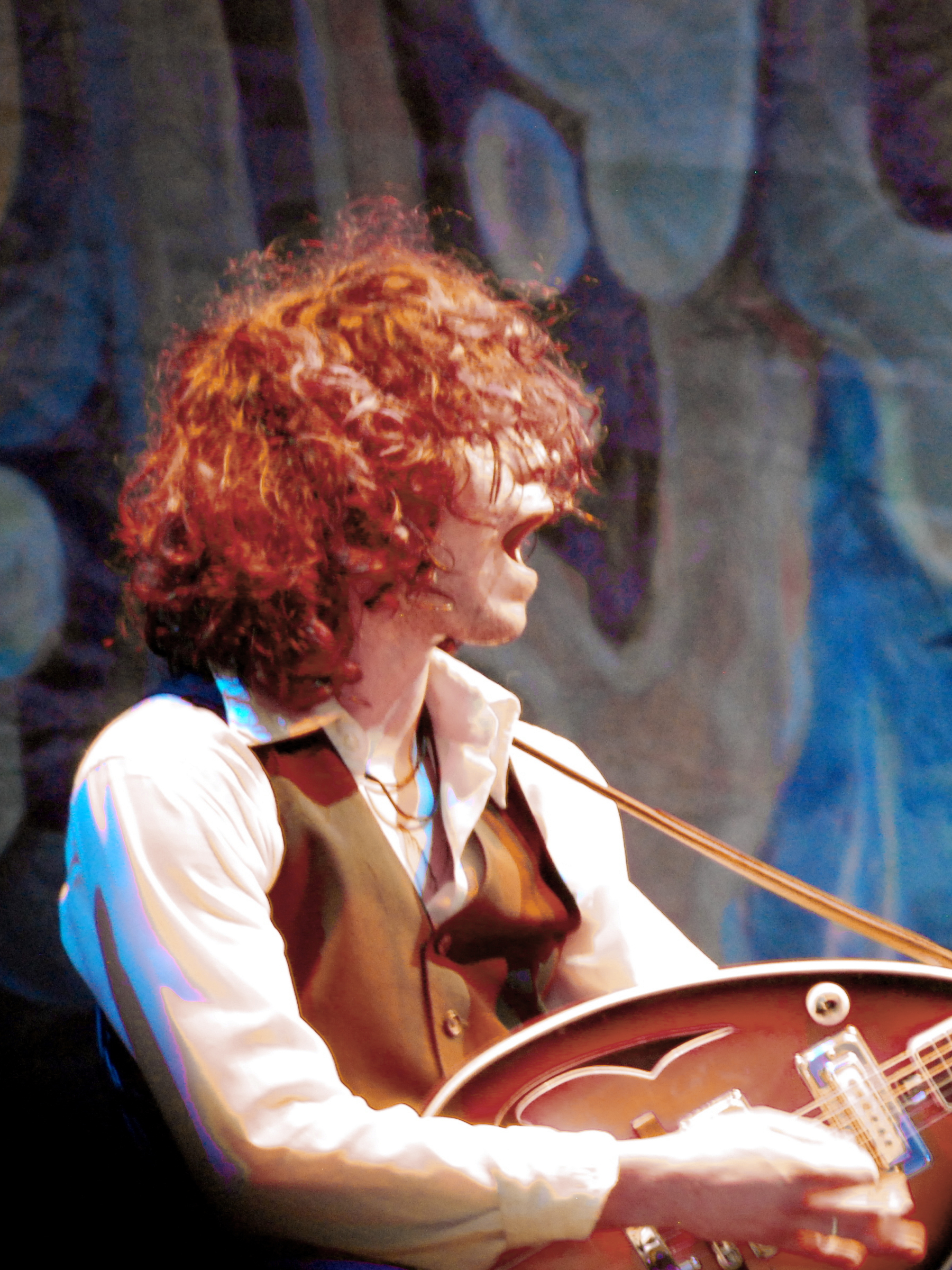
- Crawford in 2009

Background information
- Born: Ian Miles Crawford; September 29, 1988 (age 37); Springfield, Oregon, U.S.
- Genres: Alternative rock; indie rock; pop rock; power pop; pop punk
- Occupations: Musician, singer
- Instruments: Vocals; guitar
- Years active: 2007–present
- Labels: DCD2; Fueled by Ramen
- Member of: The Contestants; The Hollers; Cosmic Miles
- Formerly of: The Cab; Stamps; Never Shout Never
- Spouse: Alethea Shelton (2022-2025) www.instagram.com/p/DLTr7rFxsku/
- Website: iancrawfordmusic.com

Ian Miles Crawford (born September 29, 1988) is an American musician and singer born in Springfield, Oregon. He is most prominently known for being a guitarist and backing vocalist for a number of different bands including The Cab, Panic! at the Disco, Never Shout Never, and The Academy Is... In 2016, he founded the rock and roll group The Contestants, which released their debut studio album, No Contest, in May 2016. On April 1, 2018, he released a solo album, Grand Wheel. In 2026, Crawford is expected to release Tense/Release, the debut album from the band Crawford.

== Career ==
He was lead guitarist of The Cab from 2007 until his departure in 2009. On June 1, 2009, The Cab's lead singer Alexander DeLeon announced on his blog that Crawford had decided to leave the band. Although DeLeon did say that Crawford had decided to leave due to creative differences, there seemed to be no animosity between him and the band. For their upcoming "What Happens in Vegas..." tour, The Cab announced that their friend Bryan Dawson would be replacing Crawford.

Crawford was also a touring guitarist for Panic! at the Disco. In 2009, after the departure of Ryan Ross and Jon Walker, Crawford joined Panic! at the Disco as their touring guitarist. He left the band in 2012, explaining that he wished to make "real, genuine" music.

On June 11, 2014, it was announced that Crawford would become the lead guitarist of Never Shout Never. On November 24, 2015, it was confirmed by Crawford himself that he was kicked out of the band. Crawford also announced that he would go on tour with The Academy Is... on their 10th anniversary tour.

In 2016, Crawford formed the rock and roll band The Contestants and released their debut studio album, No Contest, on May 6, 2016.

Crawford is also a member of the Seattle band The Hollers.

In 2018, Crawford released his solo album Grand Wheel.

In 2023, Crawford released Lift Off EP with Cosmic Miles.

In 2026, Crawford is expected to release Tense/Release, the debut album from the band Crawford.

== Discography ==
=== Solo ===
- Grand Wheel (2018)
- "Losing My Religion" (R.E.M. cover)
- "Over My Head, Over Me" (demo)
- "Better in Time" music by Ian Crawford lyrics by Ren Patrick

=== With The Cab ===
- Whisper War (2008)
- Welcome to the New Administration (2008)
  - "Bounce (snippet)" & "Take My Hand Machine Shop Production" (feat. Cassadee Pope from Hey Monday)
- Punk Goes Pop 2 (2008)
  - "Disturbia" (Rihanna Cover)
- The Lady Luck EP (2009)
  - "Take My Hand (Remix)(feat. Cassadee Pope)", "Diamonds Are Forever (And Forever Is A Long Time)" & "Lights"
- Symphony Soldier (2011)

=== With Stamps ===
- Tramps (2010)
- Stamps Ventures of a Lifetime (2011)

=== With Play For Keeps ===
- 2010 Goodbye Natural, Hello Manmade. – guitar on "X.I.F."

=== With Dallon Weekes ===
- guitar on "Skid Row (Downtown)" (Little Shop of Horrors)

=== With Ashbury ===
- 2008 guitar and vocals on "Under Your Skin"

=== With Never Shout Never ===
- 2015 Recycled Youth, Vol. 1
- 2015 Black Cat

=== With Cosmic Miles ===
- 2023 Lift Off
