= Darren Wilson (musician) =

American drummer

- Born: 10 April 1986 (age 40)
- Origin: DuPage County, Illinois
- Instruments: drums, singing
- Labels: Fueled by Ramen, Decaydance Records
- Member of: The Hush Sound
- Formerly of: Until Sundown

Darren Wilson (born 10 April 1986) is an American musician who is the drummer of the Chicago-based indie-rock group The Hush Sound. He plays alongside bandmates, Wilson was a member of the band Until Sundown along with Chris Faller, until they were both recruited to play join The Hush Sound in late 2004/early 2005.

In late-July through mid-August 2009, Wilson played drums with Mark Rose (formerly of Spitalfield) on his solo outing, and continues to play scattered live dates regularly.

In 2013, The Hush Sound reunited, released new music, and toured around the United States.
