= Chris Faller =

American bassist

Chris Faller (born 1 May 1985 in Buffalo, NY) is the bassist of The Hush Sound and Company of Thieves. Faller provides vocals as well, along with bandmates Greta Salpeter, Robert Morris, and Darren Wilson. Faller joined the band last after much persuasion from drummer Darren Wilson, and since then The Hush Sound has been signed by Fueled By Ramen. Faller and The Hush Sound released a new album, titled Goodbye Blues.

In October 2008 Faller left the band to pursue other musical interests. In July 2009, while The Hush Sound was still on hiatus, Faller joined the band Family Order as a bassist. Chris later rejoined the Hush Sound on a brief tour around the United States, and helped in writing their EP titled “Forty Five”, which was released in 2013.
