= Alexander DeLeon =

American singer

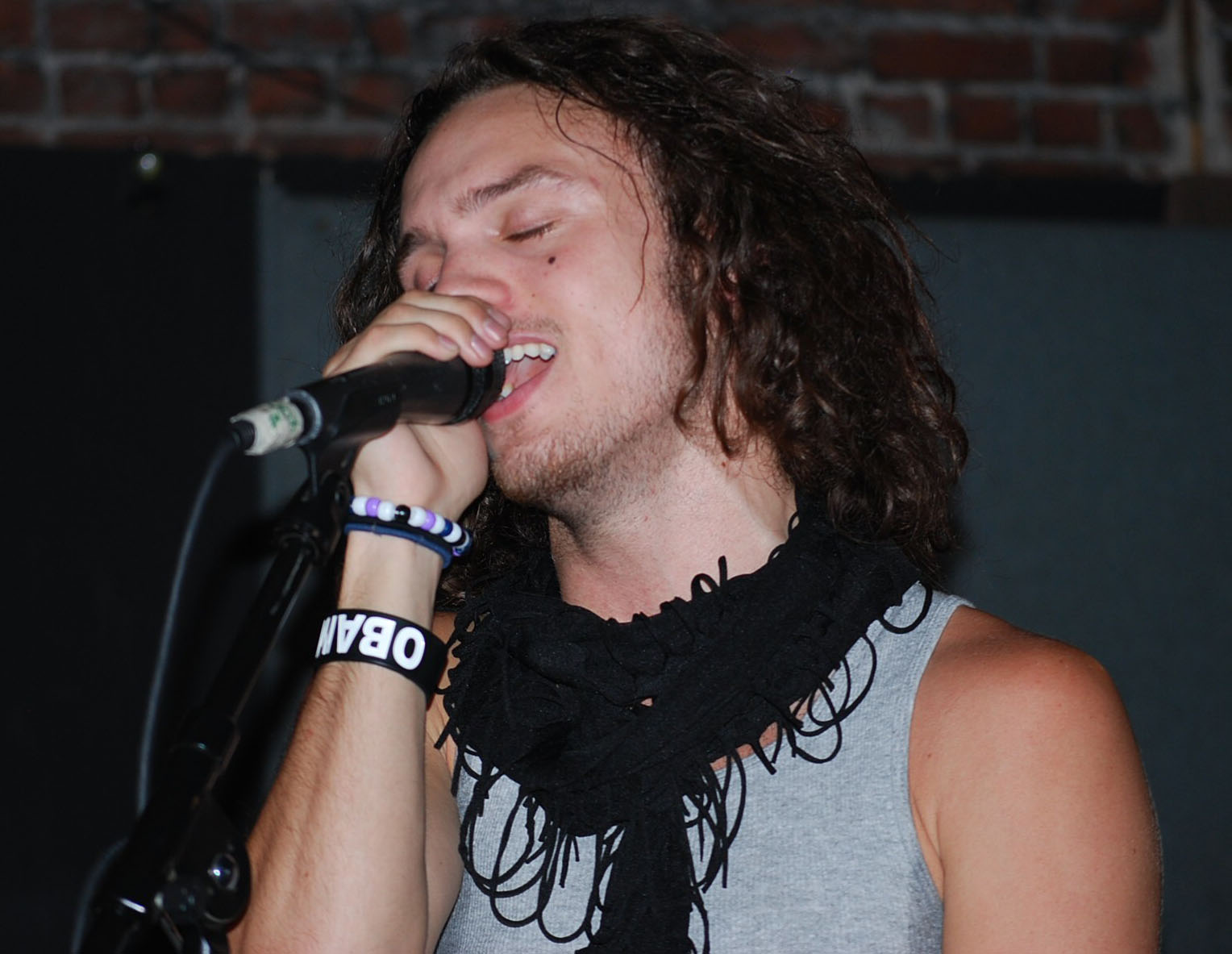
- DeLeon in 2008

Background information
- Also known as: Bohnes
- Born: Alexander Michael DeLeon; April 8, 1989 (age 37); Las Vegas, Nevada, U.S.
- Genres: Pop; pop rock; R&B; alternative rock; electropop; pop punk; emo pop
- Occupations: Singer; songwriter; musician
- Instruments: Vocals; piano
- Years active: 2004–present
- Labels: Fueled by Ramen; DCD2; Republic; Universal
- Spouse: Josephine Skriver (m. 2022)
- Website: thecabband.com

Alexander Michael DeLeon (born April 8, 1989), also known as Bohnes, is an American singer, best known as the lead singer for the rock band The Cab. With the band, he signed to Fueled by Ramen and Decaydance in 2007, subsequently releasing their debut album, Whisper War, in 2008. In 2011, The Cab released their second studio album, Symphony Soldier. The following year, the group signed with Universal Republic Records. They released the Lock Me Up EP in 2014.

As a solo musician, DeLeon began his musical project Bohnes in 2015. He released the singles "Guns and Roses" and "Middle Finger" the same year. The following year, he released the single "Witchcraft". He released his debut extended play (EP), 206: Act I, in March 2018, and his second EP, 206: Act II, in November 2018.

== Career ==
=== 2004–present: The Cab ===
DeLeon and Cash Colligan first began playing music together at Liberty High School (Henderson, Nevada) and recorded demos as a duo which they put up on their MySpace page. Deciding on the band name, the two chose to call themselves, The Cab. In late 2005, it became a full band with guitarist Paul Garcia, guitar/pianist Alex Marshall, and drummer Alex Johnson, playing its first show at The Alley in Las Vegas. The band signed to local label Olympus Records in January 2006, but released no material. Spencer Smith of Panic! at the Disco helped them sign to Decaydance Records in May 2007. Shortly after this, the band's members graduated from high school. During this time they decided to replace Garcia with Ian Crawford, who moved from Washington to join the band.

The band released their first studio album Whisper War, on April 29, 2008, featuring Brendon Urie of Panic! at the Disco and Patrick Stump of Fall Out Boy on "One of Those Nights", co-written by Stump and the first single from the CD. On June 22, 2011, The Cab parted ways with their label Fueled by Ramen and Decaydance Records and independently released their second studio album Symphony Soldier on August 23, 2011.

After remaining independent for over a year, on August 31, 2012, The Cab announced that they had signed a record deal with Universal Republic. With the signing to the record label, in late 2012, the band stated, during an interview, that they have begun work on their new album, to be released in mid-2014. An EP, Lock Me Up, was released on April 29, 2014.

=== Bohnes ===
On October 31, 2015, DeLeon introduced his solo musical project, title Bohnes, uploading a minute-long teaser music video. The following month, he released his debut single, "Guns and Roses", accompanied with its music video, which premiered on Alternative Press. On December 17, 2015, he released another track, titled "Middle Finger".

On March 4, 2016, he released the single "Witchcraft".

On September 22, 2017, DeLeon released the single "Six Feet Under" with its music video premiering on the same day. In tribute to the 2017 Las Vegas shooting, which took place on October 1, 2017, DeLeon released the song "702"; all proceeds from the acoustic track were donated to the Las Vegas Victims' Fund. Speaking about "702", DeLeon stated: "Las Vegas isn't about the neon lights, it isn't about the big names on the marquees or the fancy hotels with the chocolates on the pillows. Las Vegas isn't about the nightclubs, the world class chefs and restaurants. It's not about the gambling or the dollar signs. Last week, we found out what Las Vegas really is. What it has always been. What it will always be."

The song "Six Feet Under" was remixed by producer/dj Badhabit and released on October 20, 2017, followed by an acoustic version released a week later. On November 17, he released the single "My Friends". The song was remixed by various artists and the remixes were released together inside the "My Friends: Remix EP".

On February 16, 2018, DeLeon officially announced his debut extended play (EP), titled 206: Act I, with a scheduled release date for March 30, 2018. A second act, 206: Act II, was released on November 23, featuring the lead single "Straightjacket".

=== Other projects ===
On December 17, 2013, DeLeon announced that he would be releasing a clothing line featuring both male and female clothes. His clothing line is called 42799, Be the Black Sheep. The name comes from Frank Sinatra, a major influence on DeLeon, and a blog post DeLeon has written on his blog, called Black Sheep. The number 42799 related to Sinatra, because it was the number of Sinatra's mug shot.

On September 29, 2015 Panic! at the Disco released the single "Victorious" from their album Death of a Bachelor, which DeLeon co-wrote.

== Personal life ==
In November 2018, DeLeon became engaged to Victoria's Secret Angel Josephine Skriver, whom he had been dating since 2013. They married in Cabo San Lucas, Mexico, in 2022. They welcomed their first child, a girl, on August 24, 2023.

== Discography ==
=== Albums ===
List of albums with selected album details
Title	Details
206: Act I	Released: March 30, 2018; Label: Bohnes; Formats: Digital Download
206: Act 2	Released: November 23, 2018; Label: Bohnes; Formats: Digital Download
Detonate	Released: September 6, 2024; Label: Line and Sinker; Formats: Digital Download

=== Singles ===
List of singles showing year released and album name
Title	Year	Album
"Guns and Roses"	2015	206: Act I
"Middle Finger"	2015	Non-album singles
"Witchcraft"	2016	Non-album singles
"Six Feet Under"	2017	206: Act I
"702"	2017	206: Act II
"My Friends"	2017	206: Act I
"12 Rounds"	2018	206: Act I
"Straitjacket"	2018	206: Act II
"Coffins"	2018	206: Act II
"Don't Sing the Blues"	2018	206: Act II
"So Pissed"	2019	206: Act II
"Ugly Habits"	2020	Non-album singles
"Send in the Machines"	2020	Non-album singles
"You've Created a Monster"	2021	Non-album singles
"Vicious"	2023	Non-album singles
"Sweet Dream"	2023	Non-album singles
"Superfan"	2023	Non-album singles
"Holy Smokes"	2023	Non-album singles
"Always Halloween"	2023	Non-album singles
