= Alex T. Marshall =

American singer-songwriter

Alex Marshall
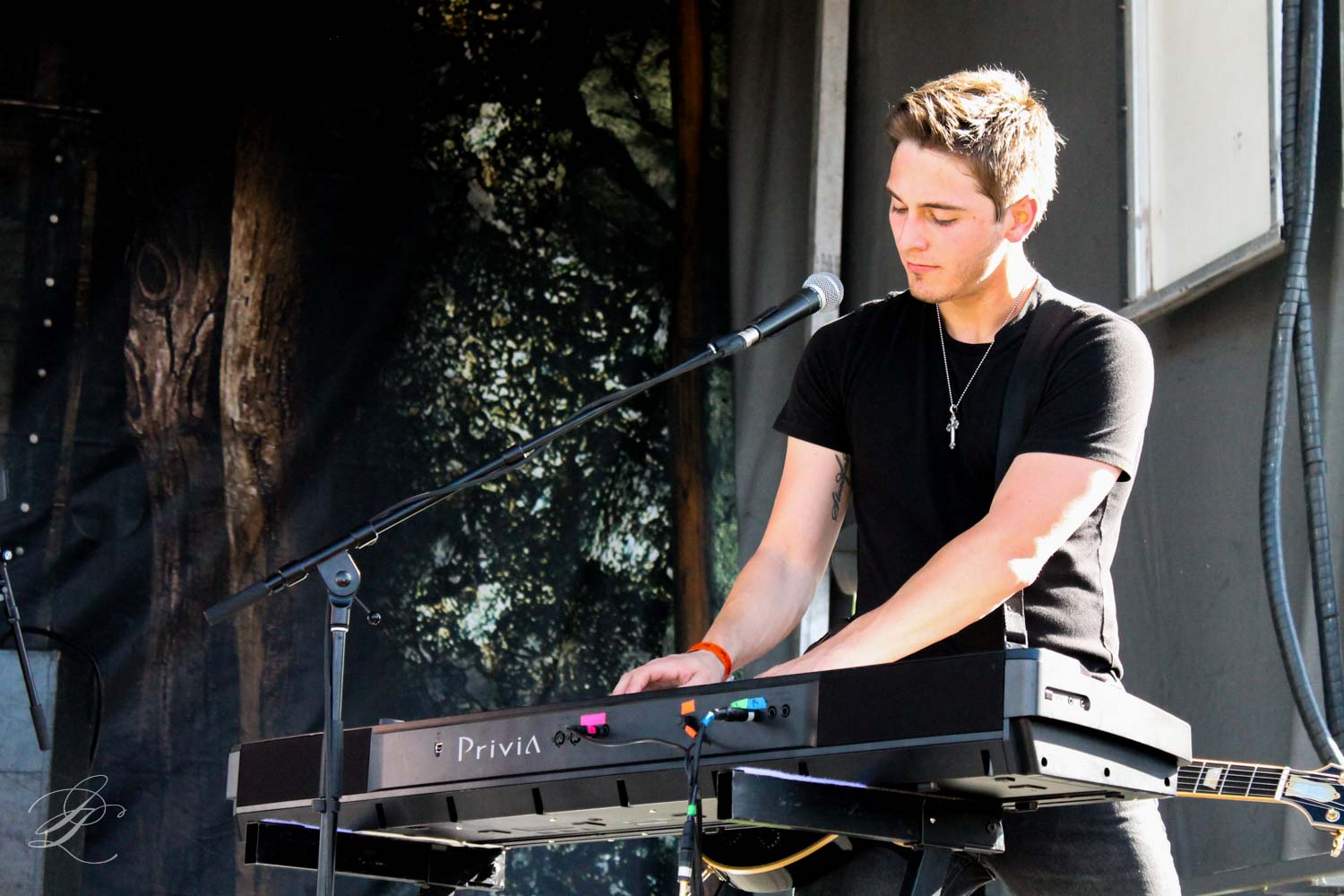
- Marshall with The Cab in 2012

Background information
- Born: Alexander Tanner Marshall; June 28, 1989 (age 37); Las Vegas, Nevada, U.S.
- Genres: Pop rock; pop punk; alternative rock; pop; R&B
- Occupations: Singer-songwriter; musician
- Instruments: Vocals; piano; guitar
- Years active: 2004–present
- Labels: Fueled by Ramen; DCD2; Republic; Universal
- Website: thecabrock.com

Alexander Tanner Marshall (born June 28, 1989) is an American musician and the pianist, keyboardist, and rhythm guitarist for the American rock band The Cab.

== Career ==
=== The Cab (2004–present) ===
In late 2005, The Cab became a full band with guitarist Paul Garcia, guitar/pianist Alex Marshall, and drummer Alex Johnson, playing its first show at The Alley in Las Vegas. The band signed to local label Olympus Records in January 2006 but released no material. The Cab was signed to Fueled By Ramen/Decaydance in 2007 and released their debut album, Whisper War, in April 2008. In June 2011, The Cab left Fueled By Ramen/Decaydance, and released their second album, Symphony Soldier, independently on August 23, 2011. In 2012 the band signed a major-label record deal with Universal Republic Records. Just days before the release of a new album, Marshall announced he was leaving the group with no specific reason. "Lock Me Up" was released in 2014 featuring Marshall. Since The Cab's return on September 26, 2025, with their newest EP "Road to Reign: A Prelude", Alex is officially back with group.

=== Solo career (2014–present) ===
Marshall released his debut single "Hurricane" on July 1, 2016 and it was going to be featured on his debut EP but for almost a decade there is no known or new information on his debut EP or other solo projects. Then a few months later he released his second single "My Girl" on November 1, 2016

== Discography ==
with The Cab

- Whisper War (2008)
- Symphony Soldier (2011)
- Road to Reign: A Prelude (2025)

Solo

- "Hurricane" (2016)
- "My Girl" (2016)
