= DCD2 Records =

US independent record label

- Parent company: Warner Music Group
- Founded: 2005; 21 years ago
- Founder: Pete Wentz
- Distributor: Atlantic Music Group
- Genre: Pop rock; power pop; alternative rock; pop punk; emo; alternative hip hop
- Country of origin: U.S.
- Location: New York City, New York
- Official website: dcd2records.com

DCD2 Records, formerly known as Decaydance Records, is an independent record label owned by Pete Wentz of Fall Out Boy and partners, based in New York City. It was founded as an imprint of Fueled by Ramen. The first band Wentz signed to the label was Panic! at the Disco. In 2014, the label relaunched as DCD2 Records, keeping the acts that were still signed to Decaydance before the relaunch. New Politics and Lolo were the first acts signed under the new name.

== Artists ==
=== Current artists ===
- Fall Out Boy
- Games We Play
- CARR
- Daisy Grenade
- Vienna Vienna
- Idkconundrum

=== Former artists ===
- Black Cards (Disbanded)
- The Cab (Active with Republic Records)
- Cassadee Pope (Active with Awake Music)
- Charley Marley (Active without a record label)
- Cobra Starship (Disbanded)
- Cute Is What We Aim For (Unsigned)
- Destroy Rebuild Until God Shows (Active, Velocity Records)
- Doug
- Four Year Strong (Active with Pure Noise Records)
- Gym Class Heroes
- Hey Monday (Active)
- The Hush Sound (Disbanded)
- Lifetime (Active with No Idea Records)
- L.I.F.T (Indefinite hiatus)
- LOLO (Active with Crush/Atlantic Records)
- MAX (Active with RED Music)
- Millionaires (Active with Graveboy Records)
- New Politics (Indefinite hiatus)
- nothing,nowhere. (Active with Reapers Realm Records)
- October Fall (Disbanded)
- Panic! at the Disco (Disbanded)
- Quinton Griggs
- Travie McCoy (Active with Hopeless Records)
- Tyga (Active with Last Kings/EMPIRE)
- The Academy Is... (Active with I Surrender Records)
- The Ready Set (Active with Hopeless Records)
- Ultra Q (Active with Royal Mountain Records)

== Discography ==
Album	Artist	Date	Other Labels
The Papercut Chronicles	Gym Class Heroes	February 22, 2005	Fueled by Ramen
A Fever You Can't Sweat Out	Panic! at the Disco	September 27, 2005	Fueled by Ramen
So Sudden	The Hush Sound	October 11, 2005	Fueled By Ramen
Like Vines	The Hush Sound	June 6, 2006	Fueled By Ramen
As Cruel as School Children	Gym Class Heroes	July 25, 2006	Fueled by Ramen
While the City Sleeps, We Rule the Streets	Cobra Starship	October 10, 2006	Fueled by Ramen
Two Songs EP	Lifetime	November 21, 2006	Fueled by Ramen
Lifetime	Lifetime	February 6, 2007	Fueled by Ramen
Santi	The Academy Is...	April 3, 2007	Fueled by Ramen, Atlantic Records
¡Viva la Cobra!	Cobra Starship	October 23, 2007	Fueled by Ramen
Does Decaydance	Doug	November 20, 2007	
Rise or Die Trying	Four Year Strong	September 18, 2007	I Surrender Records
Goodbye Blues	The Hush Sound	March 18, 2008	Fueled by Ramen
Pretty. Odd.	Panic! at the Disco	March 21, 2008	Fueled by Ramen
Whisper War	The Cab	April 29, 2008	Fueled by Ramen
No Introduction	Tyga	June 10, 2008	
Fast Times at Barrington High	The Academy Is...	August 19, 2008	Fueled by Ramen
The Quilt	Gym Class Heroes	September 9, 2008	Fueled by Ramen
Hold On Tight	Hey Monday	October 7, 2008	Columbia Records
The Day Has Come	Sarah Robertson	November 25, 2008	Atlantic Records
The Lady Luck EP	The Cab	June 30, 2009	Fueled by Ramen
Just Got Paid, Let’s Get Laid	Millionaires	June 23, 2009	B-Unique
Explains It All	Four Year Strong	July 21, 2009	I Surrender Records
Hot Mess	Cobra Starship	August 11, 2009	Fueled by Ramen
Lost in Pacific Time: The AP/EP	The Academy Is...	September 22, 2009	Fueled by Ramen
Enemy of the World	Four Year Strong	March 9, 2010	Universal Motown
Lazarus	Travie McCoy	June 7, 2010	Fueled by Ramen
I'm Alive, I'm Dreaming	The Ready Set	June 14, 2010	Sire Records, Beluga Heights
Beneath It All EP	Hey Monday	August 17, 2010	Columbia Records
D.R.U.G.S.	D.R.U.G.S.	February 22, 2011	Sire Records
Vices & Virtues	Panic! at the Disco	March 22, 2011	Fueled by Ramen
Night Shades	Cobra Starship	August 29, 2011	Fueled by Ramen, Warner Bros. Records
In Some Way, Shape, or Form	Four Year Strong	November 8, 2011	Universal Motown
The Papercut Chronicles II	Gym Class Heroes	November 15, 2011	Fueled by Ramen
Save Rock and Roll	Fall Out Boy	April 12, 2013	Island Records
Too Weird to Live, Too Rare to Die!	Panic! at the Disco	October 8, 2013	Fueled by Ramen
American Beauty/American Psycho	Fall Out Boy	January 20, 2015	Island Records
Comeback Queen EP	LOLO	July 17, 2015	
Vikings	New Politics	August 14, 2015	Warner Bros. Records
Ms. Anonymous EP	MAX	September 25, 2015	
Death of a Bachelor	Panic! at the Disco	January 15, 2016	Fueled by Ramen
Hell's Kitchen Angel	MAX	April 8, 2016	
Mania	Fall Out Boy	January 19, 2018	Island Records
Pray for the Wicked	Panic! At The Disco	June 22, 2018	Fueled by Ramen
Viva Las Vengeance	Panic! At The Disco	August 19, 2022	Fueled by Ramen
So Much (for) Stardust	Fall Out Boy	March 24, 2023	Fueled by Ramen
Cult Classic	Daisy Grenade	June 23, 2023	Fueled by Ramen

== See also ==
- List of record labels
- Fueled by Ramen
