= Believers Never Die – Greatest Hits =

Greatest hits album by Fall Out Boy
- Released: November 17, 2009 (US)
- Recorded: 2003–2009
- Genres: Pop-punk; pop rock; alternative rock; emo pop; emo
- Length: 53:48; 64:00 (with bonus tracks)
- Label: Island
- Producers: Sean O'Keefe; Neal Avron; Babyface; Patrick Stump

Fall Out Boy chronology
America's Suitehearts: Remixed, Retouched, Rehabbed and Retoxed (2009)	Believers Never Die – Greatest Hits (2009)	Save Rock and Roll (2013)

Singles from Believers Never Die - Greatest Hits
- 1. "Alpha Dog" Released: October 26, 2009

Professional ratings
Review scores
Source	Rating
AllMusic	4.5/5 stars
Blare	3.5/4 stars
Drowned in Sound	5/10
IGN	7.9/10
Kerrang!	5/5 stars
Rock Sound	8/10
Rolling Stone	3/5 stars
Toro	3.5/5 stars

Believers Never Die – Greatest Hits is the first greatest hits album by American rock band Fall Out Boy. Released on November 17, 2009 in the United States by Island Records, it contains all of the songs the band had released as singles to that point in their career, in chronological order, as well as two new songs and two rarities. It is available as a CD or CD/DVD set with music videos. The album features an original wraparound illustration by artist Daniel Danger. The artwork was revealed on October 9.

Believers Never Die was released after Fall Out Boy toured as support for blink-182's 2009 summer reunion tour and shortly before Fall Out Boy announced an indefinite hiatus in late 2009. Of the two new songs, "Alpha Dog" was released as a single on October 26, 2009, and peaked at #60 in Australia. A demo version of it was on the Welcome to the New Administration mixtape, under the name "ALPHAdog and OMEGAlomaniac". Believers Never Die was generally received positively by critics. It appeared on the charts in some countries but its commercial success was limited. In 2013, the greatest hits set was followed up with Save Rock and Roll, the band's first studio album since Folie à Deux (2008). In February 2014, Believers Never Die was certified Silver in the UK by the BPI, and was upgraded to Gold in October 2015 for 100,000 copies shipped.

== Album information ==
Believers Never Die - Greatest Hits debuted at No. 77 on the US Billboard 200 chart, finding its greatest success in Australia where it reached No. 25 on the Australian Albums Chart. In the UK, Believers Never Die peaked at No. 88 and was certified Silver by the British Phonographic Industry in 2013 for 60,000 shipments.

A limited edition CD/DVD version was released with the same album cover. It included the original CD as well as a DVD with most of the band's music videos. The DVD also features commentary from the members of the band on each video. The only official video by Fall Out Boy not included on this DVD is the music video for "Alpha Dog", which was released later. Neither the songs nor their respective videos for "The Carpal Tunnel of Love" and "Headfirst Slide Into Cooperstown On a Bad Bet" were included in Believers Never Die because they were not actually released as singles, contrary to popular misconception.

A music video for "Alpha Dog" was released on November 20, containing snippets of all of Fall Out Boy's previous music videos along with some images of photo shoots, autograph signings, and other activities not seen before on film. It begins with Pete Wentz saying that "no one should try this at home..."

Believers Never Die features two new songs, "Alpha Dog" and ""From Now on We Are Enemies"". In an interview, bassist Pete Wentz commented, "For the first new song 'Alpha Dog,' we had written like half of it and put [it on] our mixtape" as a demo to promote what would be the band's 2008 album Folie à Deux. "People really reacted to it, so we started to record over some of it. We saved a couple parts, and then we had to write the second verse and bridge. The other song, 'From Now On We Are Enemies', we wrote as a brand new song [...] The two new songs are different than any other Fall Out Boy songs. They seem like they could have been Folie à Deux B-sides, but they wouldn't have fit on the record. I'm not sure. They are the songs that have the most electronic stuff going on in them." "Yule Shoot Your Eye Out", one of the rarities, was a song taken from the compilation album A Santa Cause: It's a Punk Rock Christmas which contains songs by different bands, released in 2003; the last track and rarity is "Growing Up", a song from the band's 2002 Project Rocket / Fall Out Boy split EP. The version of "What a Catch, Donnie" on this album features lead vocalist/guitarist Patrick Stump singing the overture of "Headfirst Slide into Cooperstown on a Bad Bet". The original version of this song featured Elvis Costello singing the part, but was taken out of this release because Fall Out Boy's executives at Island Records could not create a deal with his record label, Decca Records, in time.

== Track listing ==
All songs written and composed by Fall Out Boy.

CD
No.	Title	From album	Length
1.	"Dead on Arrival"	Take This to Your Grave (2003)	3:16
2.	"Grand Theft Autumn/Where Is Your Boy"	Take This to Your Grave	3:12
3.	"Saturday"	Take This to Your Grave	3:38
4.	"Sugar, We're Goin Down"	From Under the Cork Tree (2005)	3:51
5.	"Dance, Dance"	From Under the Cork Tree	3:01
6.	"A Little Less Sixteen Candles, a Little More "Touch Me""	From Under the Cork Tree	2:50
7.	"This Ain't a Scene, It's an Arms Race"	Infinity on High (2007)	3:33
8.	"Thnks fr th Mmrs"	Infinity on High	3:28
9.	"The Take Over, the Breaks Over"	Infinity on High	3:35
10.	"I'm Like a Lawyer with the Way I'm Always Trying to Get You Off (Me & You)"	Infinity on High	3:35
11.	"Beat It" (featuring John Mayer; Michael Jackson cover)	Live in Phoenix/Folie à Deux (2008)	3:49
12.	"I Don't Care"	Folie à Deux (2008)	3:39
13.	"America's Suitehearts"	Folie à Deux	3:41
14.	"What a Catch, Donnie"	Folie à Deux	4:57
15.	"Alpha Dog"	Originally a demo from Welcome to the New Administration, re-recorded for the Greatest Hits Album	3:42
Total length:			53:48

Bonus tracks (on all editions, except where noted)
No.	Title	From album	Length
16.	""From Now on We Are Enemies""	Previously unreleased	3:36
17.	"Yule Shoot Your Eye Out"	A Santa Cause: It's a Punk Rock Christmas (2003)	3:41
18.	"Growing Up"	Project Rocket / Fall Out Boy (2002)	2:56
19.	"The Carpal Tunnel of Love" (Bonus track in Japan)	Infinity on High	3:23
Total length:			64:00

Limited DVD
No.	Title	Length
1.	"Dead on Arrival"
2.	"Grand Theft Autumn/Where Is Your Boy"
3.	"Saturday"
4.	"Sugar, We're Goin Down"
5.	"Dance, Dance"
6.	"A Little Less Sixteen Candles, a Little More "Touch Me""
7.	"This Ain't a Scene, It's an Arms Race"
8.	"Thnks fr th Mmrs"
9.	""The Take Over, the Breaks Over""
10.	"I'm Like a Lawyer with the Way I'm Always Trying to Get You Off (Me & You)"
11.	"Beat It"
12.	"I Don't Care"
13.	"America's Suitehearts"
14.	"What a Catch, Donnie"
15.	"The Carpal Tunnel of Love" (Bonus track in Japan)

- Each video has an audio commentary by the band.

== Charts and certifications ==
=== Weekly charts ===
Chart (2009–2021)	Peak position
Australian Albums (ARIA)	25
Irish Albums (IRMA)	79
Scottish Albums (Official Charts)	82
UK Albums (Official Charts)	88
US Billboard 200	77
US Top Alternative Albums (Billboard)	8
US Top Rock Albums (Billboard)	10

=== Year-end charts ===
Chart (2021)	Position
US Top Rock Albums (Billboard)	55

=== Certifications ===
Certifications for Believers Never Die – Greatest Hits
Region	Certification	Certified units/sales
Australia (ARIA)	Gold	35,000^{^}
New Zealand (RMNZ)	Gold	7,500^{‡}
United Kingdom (BPI)	Platinum	300,000^{‡}
^{^} Shipments figures based on certification alone.^{‡} Sales+streaming figures based on certification alone.
