= Youth marketing =

Marketing aimed toward youngsters

In the marketing and advertising industry, youth marketing consists of activities to communicate with young people, typically in the age range of 11 to 35. More specifically, there is teen marketing, targeting people age 11 to 17; college marketing, targeting college-age consumers, typically ages 18 to 24; and young adult marketing, targeting ages 25 to 34.

The youth market is critical because of the demographic's buying power and its members' influence on the spending of family members. In addition, teens and young adults often set trends that are adopted by other demographic groups.

== Formats ==
Youth marketing formats commonly include television advertising, magazine advertising and online marketing. Today, young people expect to be able to learn about, interact with and be entertained via brands or services targeting them online. Other common youth marketing tactics include entertainment marketing, music marketing, sports marketing, event marketing, viral marketing, school and college programs, product sampling and influencer marketing.

Examples of brands embraced by youth and used as examples in marketing cases are Vans, which used youth marketing tactics to grow from a niche skateboard shoe brand to a successful international business, Mountain Dew, a well-known soft drink brand that expanded market share through youth marketing tactics in the 1990s, and Nike, namely utilizing endorsements from athletes, celebrities and influencers, combined with deliberately powerful language in its advertising.

While frowned upon for teens and young adults, another common way advertisers target the older youth market is through product placement, which occurs when a brand name product appears in a medium not necessarily related to the product itself. Companies often pay for their products to be placed in a movie or on a television show. This act, while not an overt form of advertising, seeks to target teens and children in a subtle manner.

== Strategies ==
Youth trends, according to Professor Frank Biocca of the New Jersey Institute of Technology, are part of an environment pertaining to information regarding youth marketing rapidly evolving and interconnecting with the advances in technology alongside content quality. Besides word-of-mouth interaction, marketing can easily be seen through new media formats such as social networking, allowing youth marketing to occur on a multi-sensory level.

=== Social status and brand loyalty ===
Products and brands with Social Power encompass the notion that “Corporate cool hunters are searching for teens that have the respect, trust, and admiration of their friends.” The American Psychological Association said, “Advertisers understand the teen's desire to be "cool," and manipulate it to sell their wares, a concept that's been offered to marketers by psychologists including James McNeal. Marketers assume a silent role as manipulators and the role they manage to play is not only in the purchases of teens but also in the social statuses of teens. A key aspect to youth marketing or any targeted demographic marketing is that these products are supposed to fulfill the needs or desires of the consumer. A large portion of sales promotion is dedicated to accomplishing this. However, according to Ainsworth Anthony Bailey of University of Toledo in "The Interplay of Social Influence and Nature of Fulfillment: Effects on Consumer Attitudes," not much of this research has focused on non-fulfillment of promotional promises which in turn, breaks the trust of the consumer and hurts the entire image of the brand and its product.

The role of brand loyalty and/or belonging to a brand becomes a primary act for the young consumers. Promotion is always positive; commodities are presented as the road to happiness. In short, advertising uses existing values and symbols rather than reflecting them. Child psychologist Allen Kanner states that “The problem, is that marketers manipulate that attraction, encouraging teens to use materialistic values to define who they are and aren't.” It's key that we acknowledge the need for teens to not only identify but to let the brand identify them. It's what feeds into the notion that Marketing and Branding affects teen consumerism. Salancik & Pfeffer's (1978) Social information processing theory addresses mechanisms by which peers influence individuals' behavior and attitudes. According to this theory, social information consists of comments and observations made by people whose views an individual considers relevant. The literature on social influence suggests that this could impact consumers' perceptions.

The role of brand loyalty is the notion of a consumer preferring to buy a specific branded product in favour over another. This is becoming to play an important role in a consumers purchase behaviour. Celebrities who hold expertise and trustworthiness are typically used to positively promote a brand. The portrayal of celebrities through brand endorsed advertisements, result in the youth admiring them.

Salanik & Pferrer's social information processing theory addresses mechanisms by which peers influence individuals behaviour and attitudes. This includes the social information consisting of comments and observations made by people, who another individual considers relevant. This encompasses the notion of key opinion leaders, who are very influential in a peer group as they are perceived to have higher social standing, credibility and trust. Social media networking sites have allowed these individuals to filter information through to peers from either imagery posts on the popular Facebook and Instagram, or written posts on Twitter. Consumers will become aware of their peer's brand preferences and this can influence and change their perception of a brand. Instead of posting information themselves, many young consumers are concerned with reading and observing what other people are posting. This has an influence on consumer purchase behaviour, as young consumers are more inclined to purchase products that their peers are purchasing and posting. Through social-mediated communication, an individual can be influenced towards buying a certain brand. This will create brand loyalty within the individual.

Brands that hold social power can influence the behaviour of consumers in what they are and are not purchasing. This plays an important part in youth consumerism and can impact the social statuses of teens. The desire for teens to be classified as “cool” are taken into account by advertisers who then use this idea and manipulate it to sell their products. Products are supposed to fulfill the needs and desires of the consumer. This relates to the idea of self-concept. Self-concept consists of actual self, how an individual sees themselves and ideal self, how an individual would like to be seen. Brands play an important role in how consumers are identifying themselves. They use brands as a tool to portray their own personal image and goals. Young consumers are still finding their own identity and are using brands to define who they are. Psychologists say that this results in children developing more materialistic values and have the tendency to own endless amounts of new products, otherwise they will feel inferior. Hence, having the latest products relates positively to their social status. For example, fashion is a powerful social symbol because when a certain trend is successfully adopted by a number of people, this can impact the perceived value of the product. A consumers social identification through a brand is important as it shows loyalty for that specific brand name. This can affect the way consumers who wear certain products and brands are perceived by others. This can determine an individual's fashion preference and the purchasing behaviour of consumers in regards to brand loyalty.

=== Classroom ===
According to the Media Awareness Network, a huge space where young adults can be targeted is in the setting of education or classroom. Whether it be through sponsored health educational assemblies, or as simple as the vending machines in the lunch room, or contests/incentive programs, and the companies that supply the schools with new technologies such as MacBook computers. The academic setting becomes a prime marketing tool in reaching our youth because the classroom provides a captive audience for any product or brand to be modeled in front of. One example that the Media Awareness Network provides to explain how the academic environment can be used to silently speak and market to the youth is contests and incentive programs like the Pizza Hut reading incentives program in which children receive certificates for free pizza if they achieve a monthly reading goal. Similarly, Campbell's Labels for Education project, in which Campbell provides educational resources for schools in exchange for soup labels collected by students.

=== Internet ===
Company advertisers have exploited ‘legislative loopholes’ and have continued targeting the youth population with advertisements through the Internet. Youth Marketing has expanded to online platforms because marketers understand the importance of the youth population and how developing a strong customer relationship will allow companies to promote products when youth become adults. Advertising online has become an efficacious technique for ensuring brand awareness and persuading the youth demographic to purchase products due to the fact that advertising online can be longer, repetitive, and engaging.

Youth marketing is controversial because children are unaware that they are intentionally being targeted by company advertisers to ensure brand awareness, establish positive attitudes and encourage brand endorsement. Exposure of online advertising to the youth demographic has the ability to shape children's attitudes, cognitions and behaviour, which concerns parents because they want to be able to influence their children's buying decision, and the products and brands exposed to their children. Besides shaping children's attitudes and behaviour, parents are apprehensive about who their children talk to online, the personal information that they share and being exposed to inappropriate content.

The youth demographic prefers to be targeted by personalised advertisements because they want to be informed of a brand or product which offers a similar or related product they have previously purchased. Interruptive advertising such as television, radio, email and telemarketing are considered ineffective techniques for youth marketing because they can be ‘annoying’. The youth population approve of Internet banner ads due to the fact that they do not feel pressured by youth marketing and feel capable of assessing their own purchasing decision.

A majority of the youth population do not feel that youth marketing has inflicted any substantial pressured through advertisements. However, a minority of the youth population may not be able to comprehend the persuasive intent of an advertisement and do not necessarily feel pressured but are at risk of deception. Some argue that companies should stop targeting children with online advertisements because children have become brand savvy from being constantly exposed to them on the Internet and insist their parents purchase a certain product. However, others argue that it is important for children to develop analytical skills of consumerism and children should know the distinction between advertising and other media content, so they are not vulnerable to manipulation.

The internet allows marketers to disseminate product information via social networking platforms, a process known as viral marketing. Marketing campaigns often target younger demographics due to their high rates of digital literacy and frequent use of internet-connected devices. This demographic is often characterized by its immersion in digital culture from an early age, leading to high levels of online activity. As a result, advertisers reach these consumers through integrated content in digital games and social media platforms. Through these channels, peer-to-peer communication and social networking may contribute to brand awareness and the dissemination of word-of-mouth marketing within social circles.

Youth marketing is mainly embedded in phone apps and online games, even in virtual worlds that state there are no ads. Although the virtual worlds may state the site is ad free, players are unaware of internal advertising that encourages them to purchase upgrades to improve the player's gaming experience. It is easier to detect youth marketing in phone apps because they tend to pop up as little advertisement banners and users are having to close the ad because it is disruptive when playing.

According to the director of Saatchi & Saatchi Interactive, "[the internet] is a medium for advertisers that is unprecedented... there's probably no other product or service that we can think of that is like it in terms of capturing kids' interest." Advertisers reach the young demographic by eliciting personal information. It's as easy as getting them to fill out quick, simple surveys prior to playing these games. They offer prizes such as T-shirts for filling in "lengthy profiles that ask for purchasing behavior, preferences and information on other family members." Advertisers, then take the information they obtain from these polls and surveys to "craft individualized messages and ads" in order to draw and hook them into a world centered around a certain product or brand. The ads that surround the individual in these "cyberworlds" are meant to keep a firm grip on each individual. It provides the setting for them to be completely consumed by the advertisers messages, products, and brands around them.

These games are not just games. They're "advergames", CBS News correspondent John Blackstone reports for "Gotta Have It: The Hard Sell To Kids." Advergames allow for marketers to incorporate brands and products into a game-like setting where the child playing it, is exposed constantly to these brands and products. A 10-year-old girl who was interviewed by CBS, says she can score with Skittles, race with Chips Ahoy or hang out with SpongeBob.

"You think about that 30-second commercial, basically a lot of those games are pretty fun to play and kids really get engaged in them," Ted Lempert, president of Children Now, a group that has successfully pushed for limits on TV advertising to kids, says. "So really it ends up becoming a 30-minute commercial."

=== Kids in an adult world ===
The influence that youth have on purchases made in a household are extremely high, even on high-end items such as what vehicle the family decides to purchase. For example, one study estimated that children influenced $9 billion worth of car sales in 1994. One car dealer explains: "Sometimes, the child literally is our customer. I have watched the child pick out the car." According to James U. McNeal, author of "Kids as Customers: A Handbook of Marketing to Children," car manufacturers cannot afford to ignore the children in their marketing. Nissan is one of many companies know to do this. They sponsor the American Youth Soccer Organization and a traveling geography exhibit in order to promote and get eyes on their brand name and logo in child-friendly settings.

There's analysis of the process of the development of a child and how it relates to how marketers know they can have a great deal of power in the field of persuasion on them at such young ages. At the age of five or six, children have trouble distinguishing fantasy from reality and make-believe from lying. They do not distinguish programs from ads, and may even prefer the ads. Between seven and ten years-old, children are most vulnerable to "televised manipulation". At age seven, the child can usually distinguish reality from fantasy, and at nine, he or she might suspect deception. This could come from any personal experience where products have turned out not to be as advertised. However, they cannot fully decipher this logic and continue to have "high hopes" for future products produced by a particular brand. By the age of ten, the individual starts to have a cynical perception of ads, in that "ads always lie". Around eleven or twelve, a toleration of adults lying in advertisements starts to develop. At this stage, it's the true coming of the adolescent's "enculturation" into a system of social hypocrisy.

== Analysis ==
Due to the increase of spending on youth marketing strategies since the 1980s, several studies have been conducted by both researchers and advertisers to determine the effectiveness and impact of advertising campaigns directed at a young audience.

=== Kasser Study ===
Tim Kasser of Knox College conducted a 2004 study regarding the public perception of youth marketing, stating that since the late 1990s there have only been two large-scale opinion surveys conducted, leaving a gap in knowledge about the scientific and psychological aspects of such tactics.

The purpose of the survey was to assess a participant's attitude towards a variety of youth marketing issues in three sections: Negative behaviors in youth, acceptability of marketing in schools, and areas of change. Respondents to the survey were asked a range of questions regarding the ethics of youth marketing in all three categories. The public opinion on youth marketing ethics according to the survey was mostly negative. Among negative behaviors witnessed by respondents that was most unfavorable included increased materialism, nagging parents to purchase advertised products, increased sexual behavior, and consumption of foods that could contribute to obesity. The second section's most disagreed-upon strategy was marketing unhealthy foods in schools, followed up in the third section with most respondents stating that schools should be free of advertising.

=== Youth trends and Viacom study ===
A Viacom Brand Solutions International study titled "The Golden Age of Youth" focuses on youth marketing tactics and their application towards those in the older demographics of youth marketing, focusing on adults from 20 to 34 years old who partake in excess spending on brand-name products. According to this study, 16 to 19-year-olds are considered to be going through a "discovery period", involving their discovery of luxury and name-brand products that could potentially be seen as status symbols. As people grow older, they usually phase out of the "discovery period" and into the "experimentation period", when they hit the age range of 20 to 24 years old and focus spending on necessities, limiting frivolous spending. Those that do not fit into the age groups mentioned are part of the "golden" category, which consists of anyone 25 to 34.

Some of the key results that were produced from this case study were that 25 to 34-year-olds majorly didn't respond to the same marketing techniques as teens and those who outright refuse to engage with such techniques, whereas, in reality, only 8% involved the study were legally defined teenagers. Noted in the study was the notion that those in the "golden" category were the happiest out of all the categories and drawn towards more expensive brands compared to teens, the reason why is speculated to be due to the negative perception of materialism and branding amongst teenagers.

=== Morals and education of marketers ===
In regards to the public opinion of youth marketing, one side that has not been well-represented is that of the youth marketing industry. John C. Geraci, through the article “What do youth marketers think of selling to kids?”, conducted an online poll consisting of 878 interviews, each around 30 minutes long. The interviews covered topics such as educational backgrounds to ethics in youth marketing.

According to the polling, those that work in youth-oriented careers are 92% more likely to have a four-year degree and less likely to have academic skills specifically for dealing with children. Most of those polled also feel that the ethical standards are on par with other industries, but at the same time, they feel that ethics can be a matter of intentions and not results, including campaigns denied by companies due to a lack of accessible demographic and focus testing data utilized by marketers to appeal to youth easier.

Most ethical procedures in the youth marketing industry occur behind office walls and are usually not seen by the public, media, or politicians, which Geraci surmises that most issues with youth marketing don't originate from those creating ads, but are the result of multiple causes, citing childhood obesity as a health concern that has developed due to multiple factors, influencing how the public reacts to certain ads and products created and promoted by these companies.

=== Youth consumer behavior ===
As early adopters of new technologies, the youth are users of the digital media that are embracing new culture. "The burgeoning digital marketplace has spawned a new generation of market research companies, which are introducing an entire lexicon of marketing concepts (e.g., “viral marketing,” “discovery marketing”) to describe some of the unorthodox methods for influencing brand loyalty and purchasing decisions."The research that is done on youth marketing quickly becomes outdated by the time it is published as a result of the growth of digital media, as educators and health professionals continue to get a grasp on the situation.

Youth advertising is an important determinant of consumer behavior; it has been shown to have an influence on a youths' product preference and purchase requests. There are some scientists that believe studying youth consumer behavior is a negative thing because it impacts their beliefs, values, and moral judgments. They argue this because they believe that youth are more influenced by advertising messages than adults are. Advertising impacts usually are conducted by focusing on three specific effects: cognitive, behavioral, and affective. Usually cognitive effect studies are more focused on children's abilities to distinguish commercials from reality and their ability to understand the difference between the two. When cognitive studies are being done they will follow Piaget's theory to track the concrete development of children. Piaget's theory is divided into stages; these stages are known as the pre-operational stage, and concrete operational stage. The first stage focuses on the age group of 2- to 7-year-olds whereas the second focuses on 7- to 12-year-olds. On the other hand, there are some scientists that believe youth marketing is a good thing because it helps to define who they are as a consumer. On that note, it has been proven that requests by youth for advertised products decrease as they mature (1,14,24,26). Youth-oriented audiences tend to become more critical about their purchases and less susceptible to media advertising as they grow up. Gender also tends to have a role in a youth's thought process when requesting an advertised product. In most cases, boys are more persistent in their requests than girls. Other factors that may co-determine children's consumer behavior include socioeconomic level of the family, frequency and kind of parent–child interaction, and involvement with peer groups. These are just a few of the issues regarding youth consumer behavior and it is not going on in just our country but in other countries as well such as the Netherlands. The Netherlands is a perfect example to show how youth marketing is viewed in another country. In the Netherlands youth advertising may not mislead about characteristics or the price of the product in addition to this products aimed at children cannot have too much authority or trust amongst children. But there are loopholes in the way the Netherlands protects children from direct youth marketing. These loopholes usually question concepts such as “misleading”, “authority”, and “trust”.

The introduction of advanced technology has guided media fragmentation, which allows consumers to view information on different platforms. This has enabled the Internet to move towards a new digital media culture, allowing different forms of media such as email, websites and social media sites to converge. There are more opportunities for marketers to reach young consumers through different media platforms. This generation can be portrayed as native speakers of a digital language. As early adopters of new technology, the youth in many ways are the defining users of this digital media. The primary focus for marketers are on young people, as they are enthusiastic users of the new media. The launch of smart phones can represent this new hybrid technology which allows users alternative ways of accessing their information. Using smart phones are more commonly seen among young people than any other age group. Consumers can use smart phones for a wide range of purposes. This can range from browsing through websites, reading news articles or checking emails. The popular social networking sites such as Facebook, Instagram, Twitter, Pinterest and YouTube have social media applications especially designed for smart phones. This allows the user to have easier access to the site and thus, making it easier to communicate information across. These applications are becoming more popular among the youth as shown by a study in Canada, where most smart phones were devoted to social networking. The Internet and social networking sites have allowed the marketing concept of viral marketing to be more relevant due to the increasing number of communication channels. Viral marketing occurs primarily on the Internet from word-of-mouth communication among consumers. Through the use of technology, there are more opportunities for consumers to voice their opinions and give information on certain brands, products or services. The positive results of word-of-mouth communication can ultimately add value to the brand. It is easy for young consumers to talk about products and this type of marketing creates dialogue among other young consumers. This can lead to consumers influencing brand and product preferences onto other individuals.

Youth advertising is an important determinant of consumer behaviour. It can influence an individual's product preferences and purchases. Studying the consumer behaviour of youth may be seen as a negative thing. It could impact and contribute to changing a child's set of values and morals, whilst in the midst of shaping their character. Young consumers are more susceptible to marketing as part of the brain, the prefrontal cortex is not fully mature until early adulthood. This may lead to an individual making uninformed decisions and acting impulsively. The vulnerability of young consumers can be taken advantage of as they are more influenced by advertising messages than adults. Marketers believe that the brands consumers build relationships with when they are young will carry over and be maintained when they get older. This would increase the chances of those individuals staying brand loyal. Cognitive studies use Piaget's Theory to analyse age-based differences in a child's ability to process, understand and comprehend television content. There are three stages consisting of preoperational for ages 2 to 7, concrete operational for ages 7 to 11 and formal operational for ages above 12. In the preoperational stage, a child focusses on a products appearance, while initiating animistic thinking. In the concrete operational stage, a child now has the ability to understand the world more realistically and the intention of advertisers to sell products. In the formal operational stage, a child has the ability to distinguish motives of the advertiser. Factors that may co-determine a child's consumer behaviour include socio-economic level of the family and parent-child interaction. Young consumers may not have disposable incomes and many rely solely on parents as a source of finance. Research shows that people with higher incomes tend to have a higher level of price acceptance towards consumables. Depending on certain factors, purchasing certain brands may depend on the cost associated.

Issues regarding youth marketing and advertising and the effect they have on children are taken into consideration all across the world. The regulations to protect young child audiences against certain advertisements vary across different countries. In Greece, commercials for toys cannot be aired before 10 pm, and in Belgium, it is forbidden to broadcast commercials during children's shows. Putting a restriction on when certain advertisements are allowed to be shown, will result in less young consumers watching and absorbing the information shown. This will reduce the degree of influence the advertisement would have had on them.

=== Social responsibility and how it affects consumer behavior ===
Studies of social adolescents in social marketing media are usually concerned with activities that have heavy consequences. For example, things like smoking, violent entertainment, alcohol abuse, and fast food consumption are all things that are negatively going to affect a young consumer's consumption behavior. Recently though the demarketing of these harmful behaviors has started to occur slowly over the years, the focus of social and youth marketing has shifted from reinforcing positive behavior in favor of discouraging abusive behaviors. Since social and youth marketing are trying to head in this direction it indicates to the industry that youth marketing can be used for positive benefits. For example, rather than just a company associating itself with a non-profit or global aid organization is easy to understand. But youth more often than not want to actively get engaged in experiences that directly affect the world such as world hunger for example. Which indicates that companies should not just associate themselves with non-profit but actually offer their own non-profit experiences that young consumers can get involved with. Overall this idea and how it relates to youth marketing might seem a bit abstract but it potentially links to a young consumer's behavior. This idea of creating cause-related experiences is important for the industry to take note of when it comes to youth marketing. By influencing a young consumer view of a specific company as a well known supporter of a positive non-profit can create brand loyalty beyond traditional brand utilities. This loyalty to the brand in a sense makes the volunteer or youth-oriented customer are aiding in the production of more loyal customers to the brand. In the long run, these non-effort opportunities can become embedded in a generation and become self-producing for the company as long as they maintain the events that cause consumer loyalty.

=== Real-world examples ===
In order to understand the public's opinion on youth marketing, one must be able to understand the experiences that each generation has been exposed to while growing up. Generation Y is very similar to the baby boomer generation especially at different points in life. So it is essential to see what experiences each generation has experienced while growing up. But different formative experiences affect each person of Generation Y. For example, the events that made the biggest impression on members of Generation Y who graduated from school in 2000 were Columbine, the war in Kosovo, and Princess Diana's death.

== See also ==
- Advertising to children
- Food marketing toward children
- Viral marketing
- Word of mouth
- Online marketing
- New Media Marketing
- Youth culture
