= Folie à Deux (album) =

Studio album by Fall Out Boy
- Released: December 10, 2008
- Recorded: July–September 2008
- Studios: The Pass Studios and The Casita, Hollywood, California
- Genres: Pop; power pop; pop rock; pop-punk; alternative rock
- Length: 50:23 (standard edition); 52:23 (with CD-exclusive hidden track)
- Label: Island
- Producers: Neal Avron; Pharrell Williams

Fall Out Boy chronology
Welcome to the New Administration (2008)	Folie à Deux (2008)	America's Suitehearts: Remixed, Retouched, Rehabbed and Retoxed (2009)

Singles from Folie à Deux
- 1. "I Don't Care" Released: September 3, 2008; 2. "America's Suitehearts" Released: December 3, 2008; 3. "Headfirst Slide into Cooperstown on a Bad Bet" Released: June 15, 2009; 4. "What a Catch, Donnie" Released: September 7, 2009

Folie à Deux ([fɔli a dø]; French for "madness of two") is the fourth studio album by the American rock band Fall Out Boy, first released in Japan on December 10, 2008, by Island Records. As with their previous two albums From Under the Cork Tree (2005) and Infinity on High (2007), its music was composed by lead vocalist and guitarist Patrick Stump, with lyrics penned by bassist Pete Wentz. Regarding the writing process, the band considered Folie à Deux to be their most collaborative record.

Unlike their prior releases, the album was recorded in relative secrecy with producer Neal Avron from July to September 2008. The recording sessions inspired lyricism relating to decaying relationships, moral dilemmas, and societal shortcomings, many with a political edge. The album's style moved away from early emo power chords and toward a wider variation in genres. Fall Out Boy recruited several guest artists for Folie à Deux, as well as employing instruments and recording techniques previously unfamiliar to the group. To promote the album, the band launched a viral campaign based around a Big Brother-type organization named "Citizens For Our Betterment" and embarked on an extensive tour schedule.

Folie à Deux received positive reviews from critics, with many focused on the creativity and various styles touched on, while others expressed concern that it was overly indulgent. It did not build on the commercial success of Infinity on High, debuting at number eight on the US Billboard 200 and selling over 149,000 copies in its first week of sales. As of 2013, Folie à Deux has sold over 449,000 copies in the United States.

Folie à Deux was Fall Out Boy's last studio album before their hiatus from 2009 to 2013. The band released a greatest hits album, Believers Never Die – Greatest Hits in November 2009, before announcing the hiatus just days later.

== Background ==
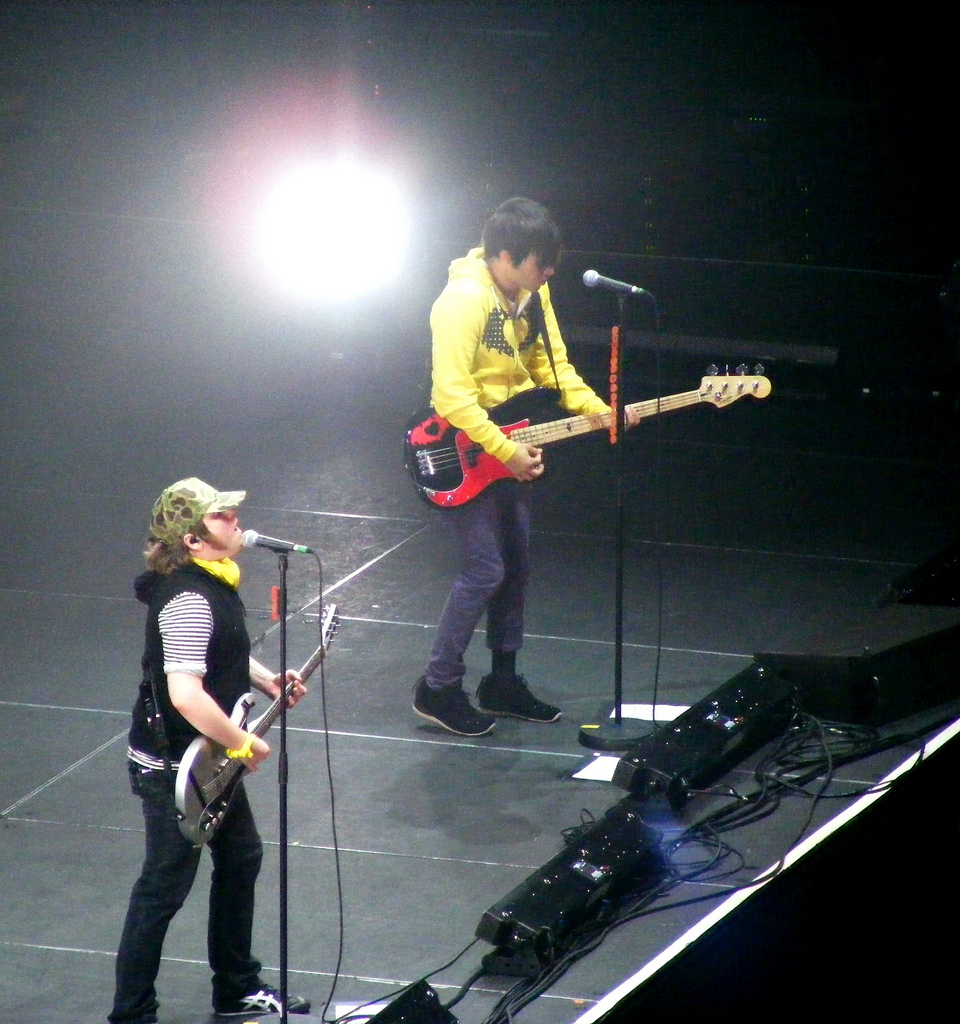
Patrick Stump and Pete Wentz performing in London on October 22, 2008. The two worked together at Stump's home during the early stages of the album's development.

Fall Out Boy began writing material for a possible successor shortly after the release of the 2007 album, Infinity on High. In March 2008, the band attempted to enter the Guinness Book of World Records for being the only musical act to perform in all seven continents in nine months, planning to perform in Antarctica for an audience of scientists. However, the group was unable to make the flight from Punta Arenas, Chile to Antarctica due to poor weather. Despite this unsuccessful attempt, the group felt energized from the experience and became inspired to write more music. This led to more material to sift through when the band decided to enter the studio. Fall Out Boy spent time during June 2008 formulating ideas at Avron's home, where "three to four" song ideas were developed. Lead vocalist/guitarist Patrick Stump and bassist/lyricist Pete Wentz began turning these ideas into songs over the following month. Wentz explained that the process was the same as usual: "I'll go over to Patrick's house and he'll kind of just sit there and play songs, and I'll be like, 'Ah, that one's awesome!'"

The band intended to work on new music sooner, but the release of its cover of Michael Jackson's "Beat It" as a single stood in the way. The single "stalled out" label Island Records, who wanted the band to film a music video for further promotion. Stump entered the studio with the intention of being less "self-indulgent", believing he dominated the band's previous record. He wished to focus more on creating a cohesive album in which different sounds come together instead of featuring his vocals at the forefront. With the help of Neal Avron, who produced Fall Out Boy's last two records, the quartet decided to simplify the music on Folie à Deux as opposed to the multi-layered sound of Infinity on High. The band was interviewed about the album constantly before even a single note was recorded, leading to misconceptions about how the record would sound. The album was first rumored to consist of entirely acoustic folk music, while other sources later alleged it would delve into rap rock.

== Recording and production ==
The band members elected to maintain a relatively low public profile during the recording of Folie à Deux, following the intense media attention that accompanied their previous album, Infinity on High. Singer Patrick Stump entered the studio with a large volume of material, reportedly 50 songs. Unlike the band’s earlier, more thematically interconnected releases, the album was conceived as a stylistically broader, more "freeing" project. The group purposefully cut short the amount of time set aside for recording the album and did not notify label executives before beginning work on the record, aiming to recreate the urgency of their early career. "There was something really interesting about that creative process when we were starting," explained Stump. "The more time you have, the more potential you have for excess." He felt that the process was reminiscent of the making of Take This to Your Grave because both albums were created using a "first-thought, best-thought" mentality: "I think we were trying to find what making a record that way would sound like now, but with four adult Fall Out Boys." Producer Neal Avron, who had worked on the band's prior two albums, returned to oversee the sessions.

The recording and release of Folie à Deux took place during a period of mounting internal strain and external distraction for Fall Out Boy. By this stage, the band had maintained a demanding cycle of touring and recording for several years, while simultaneously navigating increasingly complex personal lives and public attention. Producer Neal Avron recalled that tabloid scrutiny surrounding bassist Pete Wentz—including intense paparazzi presence during sessions—contributed to a chaotic atmosphere. In retrospect, Stump described the period as one in which the band, alongside Avron, reached a creative peak musically, while interpersonal relationships within the group were at a low point. Avron described increased "bickering" and a reduced day-to-day studio presence from Wentz; he remembered that the lead single "I Don't Care" emerged in part from a contentious exchange between Stump and Wentz. Stump recalled: "I threw something across the room over a major-to-minor progression." By this point, Stump later conceded, "I had gotten tired of trying to retrofit my melodies with Pete lyrics and Pete had gotten tired of trying to push melody ideas."

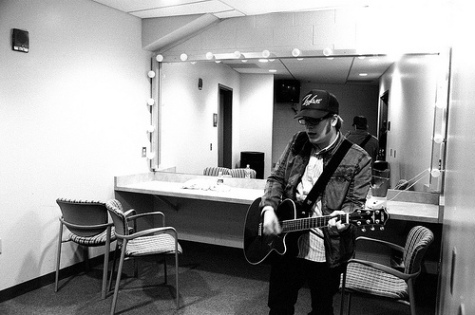
Patrick Stump, pictured in a 2008 dressing room, assumed a central creative role during the recording of Folie à Deux.

Folie à Deux overall saw Stump take on a more prominent role within the band, with his musical sensibilities shaping the album more strongly than on previous releases. The record incorporates a broader range of influences, including pop and R&B, as well as artists such as Prince, Michael Jackson, and Elvis Costello. Although the band’s interpersonal dynamics had shifted—appearing less cohesive than in earlier years and, to some observers, operating more like "coworkers" than a close-knit unit—concerted efforts were made to foster a more collaborative creative process. On earlier releases, guitarist Joe Trohman and drummer Andy Hurley had expressed concerns about limited creative input, as songwriting was largely driven by Stump and Wentz. During the development of Folie à Deux, efforts were made to address this imbalance, with Trohman in particular seeking greater involvement in the band's creative process. At the same time, Trohman was dealing with personal challenges, including substance abuse, which ultimately affected the extent of his songwriting contributions.

The album also features additional collaborations, including guest cameos from Costello, Lil Wayne, and Pharrell Williams, who developed beats for "W.A.M.S.". The inclusion of numerous guest performers was intended to serve a conceptual role, with Wentz likening them to characters within a play. Some tracks, such as "What a Catch, Donnie", took on a retrospective tone; Stump later indicated that he and other members felt the band might be "winding down," shaping the song into a self-referential piece that incorporated motifs from earlier works and featured guest contributions from contemporaries of the mid-aughts emo scene, including Brendon Urie, Travie McCoy, Gabe Saporta, Alexander DeLeon, and William Beckett. Participants in the recording process described the track as carrying the atmosphere of a farewell.

== Composition ==
=== Music ===
On Folie à Deux, Fall Out Boy continued its pattern of musical experimentation that began on the band's previous album, Infinity on High. Singer/guitarist Patrick Stump was once again the primary composer, and attempted to create compositions that echoed the themes discussed in Wentz's lyrics. As the lyrical content shifted in new directions from the group's previous works, the musical style employed by the other band members evolved as well. On this topic, Trohman commented "It's not like we said, 'We want to push the envelope,' It's not that at all. We just wanted to try cooler things. The album still sounds like Fall Out Boy. It has big choruses. But you can't do the same thing every record."

The record contains more instruments not present in the band's previous work, including synthesizers, sequenced drums, and strings. Critics noted similarities between the album and 1980s arena rock. Joey Rosen of Rolling Stone commented that "They further explore their funky side here: Stump is emerging as one of the world's most unlikely blue-eyed-soul stars, breathing life into classic R&B chord progressions and flaunting his agile voice." Trohman drew influence from Queen while creating guitar harmonies to match Stump's vocals on the record, while his other styles were inspired by Metallica, Prince, and the Rolling Stones. He also employs a jazz guitar interlude on "w.a.m.s." which has been likened to Steely Dan. Trohman felt that the band were musically expanding at a thoughtful pace: "To me, it felt as if this was our version of Queen's shift from the hard rock of Sheer Heart Attack to the genre-bending experimentation of A Night at the Opera," he said in 2021.

The pregap hidden track "Lullabye" is an acoustic ballad influenced by Bob Dylan, written with the intention of helping Wentz' son, Bronx Mowgli, fall asleep. Leah Greenblatt of Entertainment Weekly categorized the album's opener, "Disloyal Order of Water Buffaloes", as a "towering guitar anthem built on wedding-march organs, thundering drums, and singer Patrick Stump's limber vocals." "Coffee's for Closers" is similarly percussive and features drummer Andy Hurley drawing influence from marching band drumwork. The first single "I Don't Care" has been described as "disco rockabilly", and contains a repeating blues riff throughout the song; Stump's vocal performance on the track has been compared to John Lee Hooker.

"Headfirst Slide into Cooperstown on a Bad Bet" is an example of the album's theme of contrasting moods, and "struts in on a massive drum line and crunching, processed guitars, gets amplified by a four-piece horn section, then falls away to a simple, somber piano line" according to James Montgomery of MTV. The Elton John-influenced "What a Catch, Donnie" is a piano-driven ballad that features a string section in the background. As the song closes, it features Brendon Urie, Alexander DeLeon, Travie McCoy, Gabe Saporta, Elvis Costello, and William Beckett singing parts of previous Fall Out Boy songs. According to Stump, the song contains lyrics that were important to the band and "gives us the chance for this record to come full circle". The backing vocals in "America's Suitehearts" have been compared to groups such as the Beatles. Stephen Thomas Erlewine of AllMusic stated "Fall Out Boy pile everything onto their fifth album: cameos from superstars and running mates, so many that Lil Wayne and Debbie Harry are barely heard; thundering arena rock rhythms and ultra-slick hair metal riffs; hints of soul and R&B." Critics have described the album as being a pop, power pop, pop rock, pop-punk, and alternative rock.

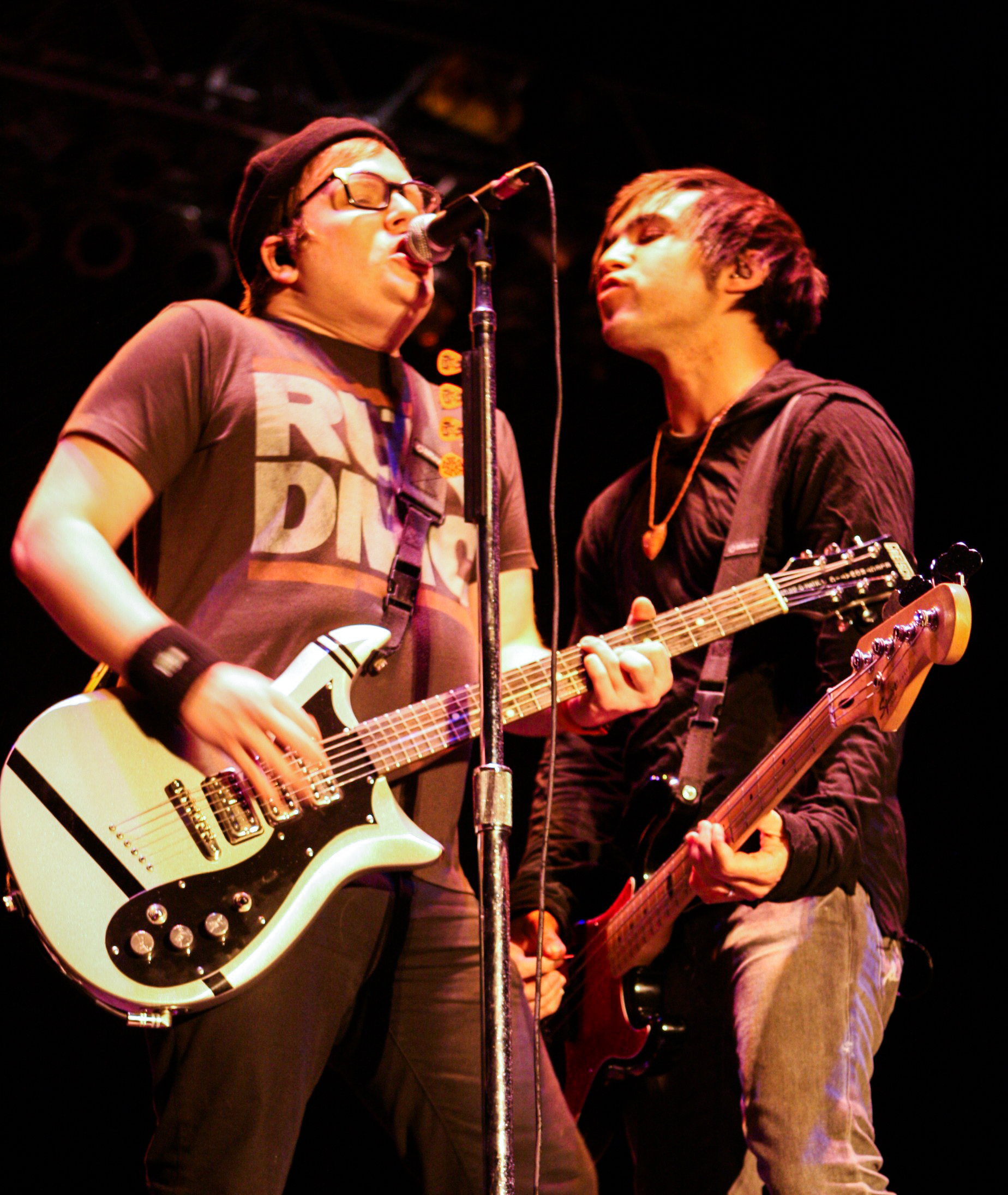
Stump (left) felt that Folie à Deux was Wentz' (right) strongest album lyrically.

=== Lyrics ===
Pete Wentz was once again the primary lyricist of the band during the production of the album. Stump said that Wentz "totally outdid himself on this record. He doesn't even know how good his lyrics are here." Wentz, despite many recent personal developments (marriage to Ashlee Simpson, birth of his son, Bronx), desired to shift the focus away from himself and turn it outward onto the world. For the first time on a Fall Out Boy album, Folie is rarely autobiographical, as the band believed the format was "losing its luster" because "everyone was doing it." The songs on the album explore decaying relationships, moral dilemmas, politics, and societal shortcomings, as well as concepts such as trust, infidelity, responsibility, and commitment. Stump tagged Folie à Deux as a "message record" that aims for "the materialistic dance between any two parties obsessed with each other, whether it's teenage girls and handbag makers, politicians and lobbyists or tabloids and stars." Folie à Deux also dissects how self-motivated American culture is, and many of the lyrics are intended to be satirical. While the album does contain political overtones, the band wanted to avoid being overt about these themes, leaving many lyrics open to interpretation for listeners.

Wentz referred to "I Don't Care" as a "narcissist's anthem" that addresses the current generation's short attention span. Wentz further explored the subjects of narcissism and apathy in "(Coffee's for Closers)", as Stump explained, "The past decade has been totally about 'me.' It's totally about 'Oh, I'm sad. I want this. I know somebody who knows this person. Me me me me me,' so that's what that song is about." Additionally, "America's Suitehearts" discusses society's fixation with celebrities and the desire to let them do no wrong. "27" explores the hedonistic lifestyles common in rock and roll music. The title is a reference to the 27 Club, a group of influential musicians, including Janis Joplin, Kurt Cobain, and Jim Morrison, who all died at the age of 27. Wentz felt that he was living a similarly dangerous lifestyle, and was "stoked" to make it to his 28th birthday. Stump added, "There was a countdown clock and everything. I remember, our manager called me up on Pete's 28th birthday and screamed, 'We made it!'"

== Title and artwork ==
"I think it's just a metaphor, really. It's a psychiatric term for when crazy people get together and their out-of-control psyches enhance one another, and not always in positive ways. I think it describes the inner workings of Fall Out Boy. When the four of us get together in a room, things get pretty insane."

— Joe Trohman, on the significance of the album's title.

Folie à deux is a rare psychiatric syndrome in which symptoms of a delusional belief are transmitted from one individual to another. The same syndrome shared by more than two people may be called folie à trois, folie à quatre, folie en famille or even folie à plusieurs ("madness of many"). Recent psychiatric classifications refer to the syndrome as dependency psychotic disorder or induced delusional disorder, although the research literature largely uses the original name. The disorder was first conceptualized in 19th-century French psychiatry. In keeping with the record's socially aware nature, the band felt that the term was relevant to the candidates in the 2008 U.S. presidential election. Stump further clarified the title's meaning: "The irony is that people will probably mistake the title as something about romantic relationships in some way. And it's our only record where that theme is not touched upon."

On September 13, 2008, the album artwork was revealed on the band's website. The cover of the album was painted by artist Luke Chueh. Wentz contacted Chueh and asked him to create the piece, to which the artist agreed. Chueh recalled of the situation, "They were great to work with, having given me full creative control over both the artwork and the final design of the cover." Chueh used the title and underlying themes of the album as inspiration for the artwork. "The title of the album is Folie à Deux, and when considering this with the band's popularity, I chose to focus on the idea of fandom, and how some people are willing to take their love/infatuation to levels that are obviously unhealthy." Wentz currently owns the original painting. The disc's liner notes contain pictures of the band members with blank pages next to them; the group allowed fans to submit pictures they had drawn in the spaces and posted them to the band's website.

== Promotion and release ==
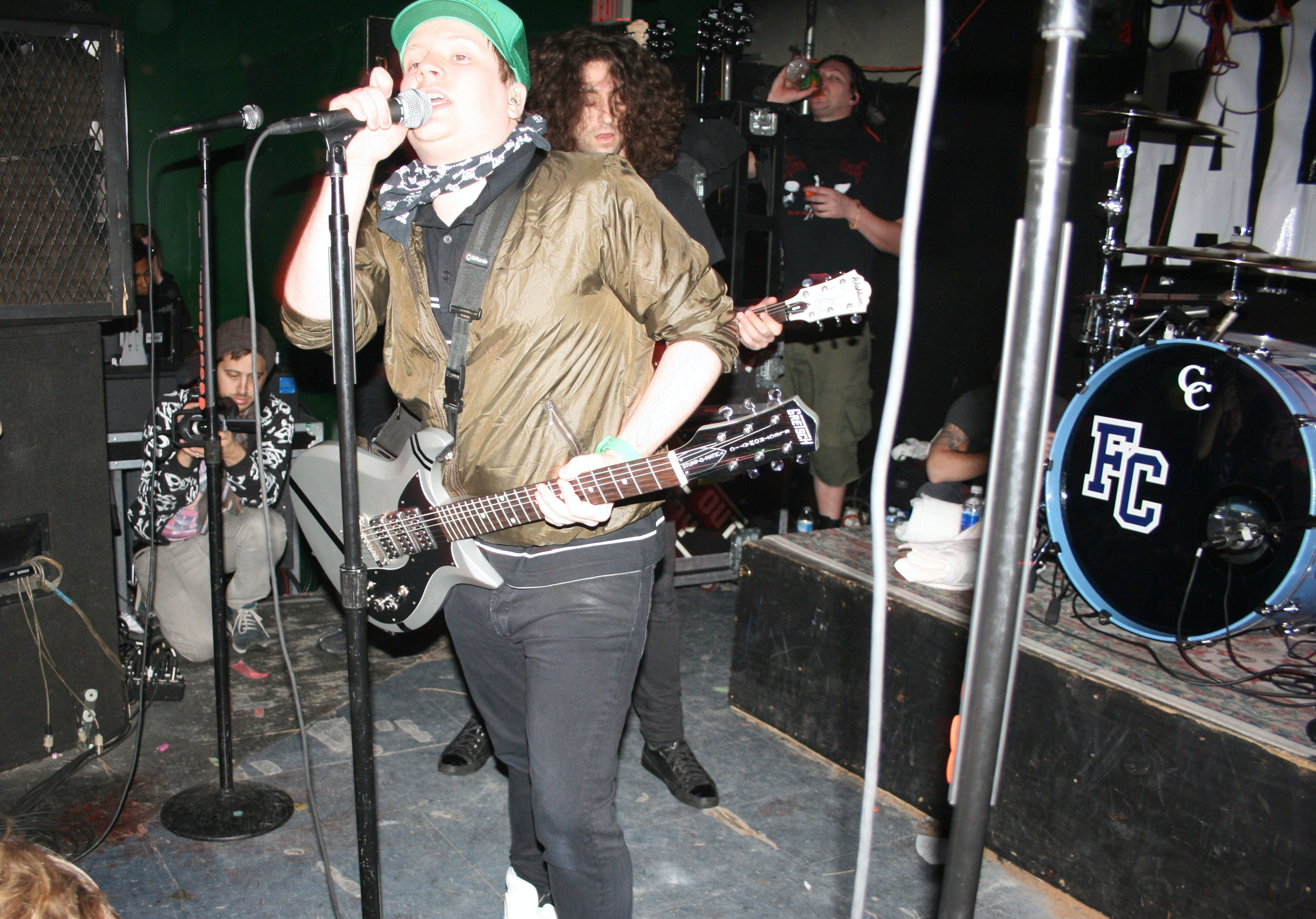
Fall Out Boy performing in a secret show in St. Louis, Missouri, on December 4, 2008, shortly before the release of Folie à Deux

The promotional cycle for Folie was complex: it encompassed a viral campaign, conflicts in pre-release promotion, and a change in the album's release date. As the release of the new album approached, the band and its management found that they would have to navigate changes in the music industry, which Hurley described as "a completely different place." Facing declining record sales, the lack of a proper outlet for an exhibition of music videos, and the economic crisis, Hurley commented that "people are buying things they need to survive rather than records and concert tickets." The group's 2007 album Infinity on High sold one million copies, which was considered a disappointment compared to From Under the Cork Tree's sales of three million. Trohman attributed this to "the same reason that nobody's records are selling that well: there's so much turmoil in the music industry, so much downsizing, and people are finding different ways to get their music more and more all the time. There's very little we can do about that as a band. All we can do is try to make great music and hope it connects with people."

The broader musical landscape also shifted significantly during this period. The late 2000s saw the rise of electronic and dance-oriented pop, driven by artists such as Lady Gaga and Rihanna. Commentators noted that this shift, alongside the perceived saturation of the pop-punk and emo scene, contributed to changing audience tastes and reduced commercial viability for bands associated with that genre. Scene critic Andy Greenwald observed that the cultural climate was changing with the beginning of the Obama era, making confessional emo less in step with the prevailing musical trends. Johnathan Daniel, the band's manager, noted that management shifts at the label had impacted the rollout. Producer Neal Avron recounted that the label briefly pulled support for lead single, "I Don’t Care," after mistakenly reading radio data as poor, only to later realize the song was performing well; by then, however, it was too late to restore momentum, which he described as a critical blow to the album's commercial trajectory. Trohman, in his memoir, suggests that he felt Island had botched the release strategy, acknowledging that "I Don't Care" had been issued too far in advance of the album.

=== Singles and music videos ===
Three singles were released from the album: "I Don't Care", "America's Suitehearts" and "What a Catch, Donnie". As part of a new marketing ploy, Fall Out Boy released several songs on iTunes before the release of Folie à Deux. When purchased, the songs would go towards purchasing the entire album as part of the "Complete My Album" feature. "I Don't Care" was made available for streaming on September 3, before being released as a single on September 8. It reached a peak at number twenty-one on the Billboard Hot 100. It was certified Platinum by the RIAA for shipments of one million copies. In Australia, the song peaked at number twenty on the ARIA singles chart, being certified Gold by the ARIA, denoting shipments of 35,000 units. The music video for the single was released on the internet on September 25, but was pulled from iTunes and YouTube shortly after. Wentz wrote angrily on his blog, finding the video was full of product placement shots for Nokia phones.

"I Don't Care" was followed by the digital release of "Headfirst Slide into Cooperstown on a Bad Bet" on October 7, 2008. It debuted and peaked at number 74 on the Hot 100. It also reached the Canadian charts at number 64. The second digital song, "What a Catch, Donnie", was released a short time later on October 15, charting at number 94 on the Hot 100. "America's Suitehearts" was made available for streaming on October 26. The third digital song, "America's Suitehearts" (later becoming the second radio single) was also released digitally to iTunes on December 2, 2008. A music video for the track premiered on January 1, 2009. A behind-the-scenes video of making the music followed a day later.

"Headfirst Slide Into Cooperstown on a Bad Bet", "What a Catch, Donnie" and "America's Suitehearts" were digitally released before the album as part of iTunes' "Complete My Album" feature. "America's Suitehearts" was then commissioned as the album's second single on January 12, 2009. As a single it reached number 78 on the Hot 100, number 71 on Digital Songs week ending May 16, 2009, as well as peaking at number 30 on the Pop Songs chart on April 25. In Australia, the song hit number 26 and logged in at number ninety-seven in the UK. "Headfirst Slide into Cooperstown on a Bad Bet" impacted United States modern rock radio on June 15, 2009.

=== Citizens for Our Betterment and Welcome to the New Administration ===
A viral campaign was launched by Pete Wentz on August 18, 2008, to promote the album. It was inspired by George Orwell's novel Nineteen Eighty-Four (1949), and the autocratic, overbearing Big Brother organization. The campaign started when the website for Wentz's Decaydance Records label was supposedly "hacked" by an organization called "Citizens for Our Betterment" (CFOB). Clues were left in links and images on the website, and Wentz left clues on his personal blog. On August 19, Wentz' wife Ashlee Simpson was seen carrying a pamphlet for the organization, raising suspicion and sparking many rumors online. In the days that followed, new posts appeared on the Citizens For Our Betterment website and Wentz continued to blog, at times referring to November 4, the same day as the 2008 U.S. presidential election. Meanwhile, another band, Copeland, launched its own viral campaign. As part of it, Copeland launched a similarly named site, CitizensForOurBetterment.com, and spread links through various Fall Out Boy fan blogs to attract more people to the new website.

While this mixing of campaigns was done without the knowledge of the members of Fall Out Boy, Wentz did post an acknowledgment on August 22, when CFOB again "hijacked" the Decaydance Records website. Decaydance act the Cab began performing with "Citizens For Our Betterment" written on the group's instruments. Finally, on August 26, a blog post of a press release was made on the band's FriendsOrEnemies.com page; it announced Folie à Deux as the title of the upcoming album, due for release on November 4. Wentz said of the endeavor "To me, this is not a marketing campaign. It is a way to cause excitement about your art and have people earn it and understand it...I don't believe the full campaign has begun, and I also believe people are taking over the ship in a truly viral way. It doesn't hurt anyone, and hopefully, it tells the story of the project better and makes it more appreciated."

It also revealed that a mixtape, titled Welcome to the New Administration, was available for download for free on the FriendsOrEnemies website. The mixtape contained several snippets of new Fall Out Boy tracks, as well as new music from other bands such as Gym Class Heroes, Cobra Starship, and Panic! at the Disco. However, none of the titles were confirmed for Folie à Deux. It also featured a song titled "America's Sweethearts" which was eventually confirmed for the album but with an alternate spelling, "America's Suitehearts". The band confirmed that it intended to release the mixtape in conjunction with the "Citizens" campaign, and felt that it was relevant to not only the themes of the album, but the 2008 election as well. Wentz explained "The whole campaign is part of the record and people can call it whatever they want, but the mixtape was part of that campaign, and we'll see what happens from here...In creating this autocratic organization, we created a democratic campaign, because people have made it go the direction they wanted it to go."

=== Release date change ===
Initially, the album's release date was reported to be November 4, 2008, coinciding with the 2008 presidential election. Fall Out Boy later announced on October 13 that the early November date was in doubt, citing concerns over the planned election day tie-in. The band was stressed out and hard on a tight deadline to get the album out on November 4. While on a promotional tour in Spain, the band realized that things were "spinning out of control", and, in a rushed-out statement, explained:

Six months ago we thought it would be a fun idea to release our album on election day but this is not the election to be cute. We felt as though rather than making a commentary we were only riding the wave of the election. This seemed less and less like what we intended to do and more of a gimmick. It is now in the hands of our label to give us a new release date. We intend to get our record out this year and as soon as possible -- as we made sure to have it done in time for its original release.

Deciding to postpone the album release in a season in which artists like Britney Spears (Circus), Beyoncé (I Am... Sasha Fierce), Kanye West (808s & Heartbreak), and Guns N' Roses (Chinese Democracy) had already set release dates, the only one available was six weeks later than expected. The album was made available for streaming on December 8. It was soon announced that a new release date for Folie was December 10, 2008. Although December 10 was not an ideal date according to demographic marketing analysis, Stump said "we put our eight feet down [and] told our label it must come out this year."

== Critical reception ==
Professional ratings
Aggregate scores
Source	Rating
Metacritic	73/100
Review scores
Source	Rating
AllMusic	4/5 stars
The A.V. Club	A
Entertainment Weekly	B
The Guardian	3/5 stars
Los Angeles Times	2.5/4 stars
MSN Music (Consumer Guide)	B−
NME	8/10
The Observer	4/5 stars
Rolling Stone	3.5/5 stars
Spin	3.5/5 stars

The album received generally positive reviews from music critics. At Metacritic, which assigns a normalized rating out of 100 to reviews from mainstream critics, the album received an average score of 73, based on 21 reviews, which indicates "generally favorable reviews". Dan Martin of NME gave the record a very positive review, calling a "defining statement" with the band's "most stylistically hatstand-but-indisputably-best songs yet." He wrote, "We're not saying it's as good as genre watermarks American Idiot or The Black Parade. We're just saying it comes close," closing with calling it a "staggering achievement." Stephen Thomas Erlewine of Allmusic rated the album four out of five stars and compared it to labelmate Panic! at the Disco's effort earlier in the year, Pretty. Odd. He wrote that "Fall Out Boy captures the Zeitgeist of the latter half of the 2000s better than any band: there's so much going on in Folie à Deux, you either choose to take it all seriously or take none of it. Fall Out Boy make as much sense when heard either way." Scott Heisel wrote for Alternative Press, commending the band for its "creativity, ingenuity and willingness to try just about anything." He compared the meaning of the term folie à deux ("a madness shared by two") to the two very distinct feelings expressed in the different sides of the record, calling the album a good representation of the band's career.

Many critics commented on the album's musical experimentation. Jody Rosen of Rolling Stone, in his review, stated that "the musical mix on Folie à Deux suggests a band with an advanced case of ADD, ricocheting between genres and eras, tempos and time signatures, often several times in a given song." Spin's David Marchese complimented the album's forays into strange territories, calling tracks such as "I Don't Care" and "What a Catch, Donnie" impressive. Rock Sound's Faye Lewis also enjoyed the variety, calling the album "a non-stop exotic cabaret for the ears, delivering a far-reaching selection of songs that leap between a blend of catchy pop punk." However, some critics felt that the band was excessive in its attempts to create a diverse work. Margaret Wappler of the Los Angeles Times believed that "Folie à Deux imagines itself in the stadium. [...] It's not that FOB can't have grandiosity, but every stadium needs open air." She called the album's sounds a "pleasure bot of right-now pop, adroitly programmed with crunchy '80s melodies, emo's dark prowess and symphonies à la Sgt. Pepper's," while stating "For all the steps forward, Folie a Deux also seems to contain a microchip for its own destruction."

Q called the album "a barrelling, hugely confident record that should see Fall Out Boy swiftly elevated into mainstream rock's premier league," and Blender called it "the brightest, breeziest, giddiest record Fall Out Boy have ever made." Blender ranked Folie at number 10 on its 33 best albums of the year list. Jaimie Hodgson of The Observer complimented producer Neal Avron's "squeaky clean" production. In a more negative review of the album, Jesse Cataldo of Slant Magazine wrote that "the band's songs are catchy at heart, enjoyable in a trifling but substantial way, until they're smeared with layer after layer of smarm, nullifying any chance of their music being consumed as a simple, empty pleasure." Cataldo also expressed displeasure with Lil Wayne's performance as well as production from Pharrell Williams, which he deemed a "promising concept [...] quickly discarded", summarizing that, "Folie à Deux seems to prove, if nothing else, that Fall Out Boy is good at masking their best qualities and pushing forward their most annoying ones."

== Commercial performance ==
Folie à Deux has sold 449,000 copies in the US to date February 2013, but did not perform as well commercially as its predecessor, Infinity on High. It debuted at number eight on the US Billboard 200 chart with first week sales of 149,000 copies during a highly competitive week with other big debuts, becoming Fall Out Boy's third consecutive top ten album. This is in contrast to the band's more successful previous effort which shifted 260,000 copies in its opening week to debut at number one the chart. Folie spent two weeks within the top 20 out of its 22 chart weeks. It also entered Billboard's Rock Albums and Alternative Albums charts at number three. With 39,000 digital downloads as part of its sales totals in its debut week, the record opened at number one on Billboard Digital Albums chart, the band's second number one album on that chart. Fall Out Boy was bested in the group's chart debut by R&B singers Keyshia Cole—whose A Different Me landed at number two on sales of more than 321,000—and Jamie Foxx, whose Intuition logged 265,000 for a number three debut. Taylor Swift's Fearless reigned at number one during that week. Within two months of its release, Folie à Deux was certified Gold in the United States by the Recording Industry Association of America (RIAA), denoting shipments of 500,000 copies.

Outside the United States, the album was also less widely successful than Infinity on High but managed to reach the top 10 in Australia where it received a Platinum certification from the Australian Recording Industry Association (ARIA) for shipments of 70,000 units. On the Australian chart, the record debuted and peaked at number nine and spent its first seven weeks within the top 20 out of its fifteen weeks in the top 40. In the United Kingdom, the album spent six weeks on the UK Albums Chart and was later certified Silver by the British Phonographic Industry (BPI) for the shipments of 60,000 units. Folie logged 12 weeks on the New Zealand Albums Chart with a peak of 26. The album also peaked at number twenty-one on the Top Canadian Albums chart.

== Tours and performances ==
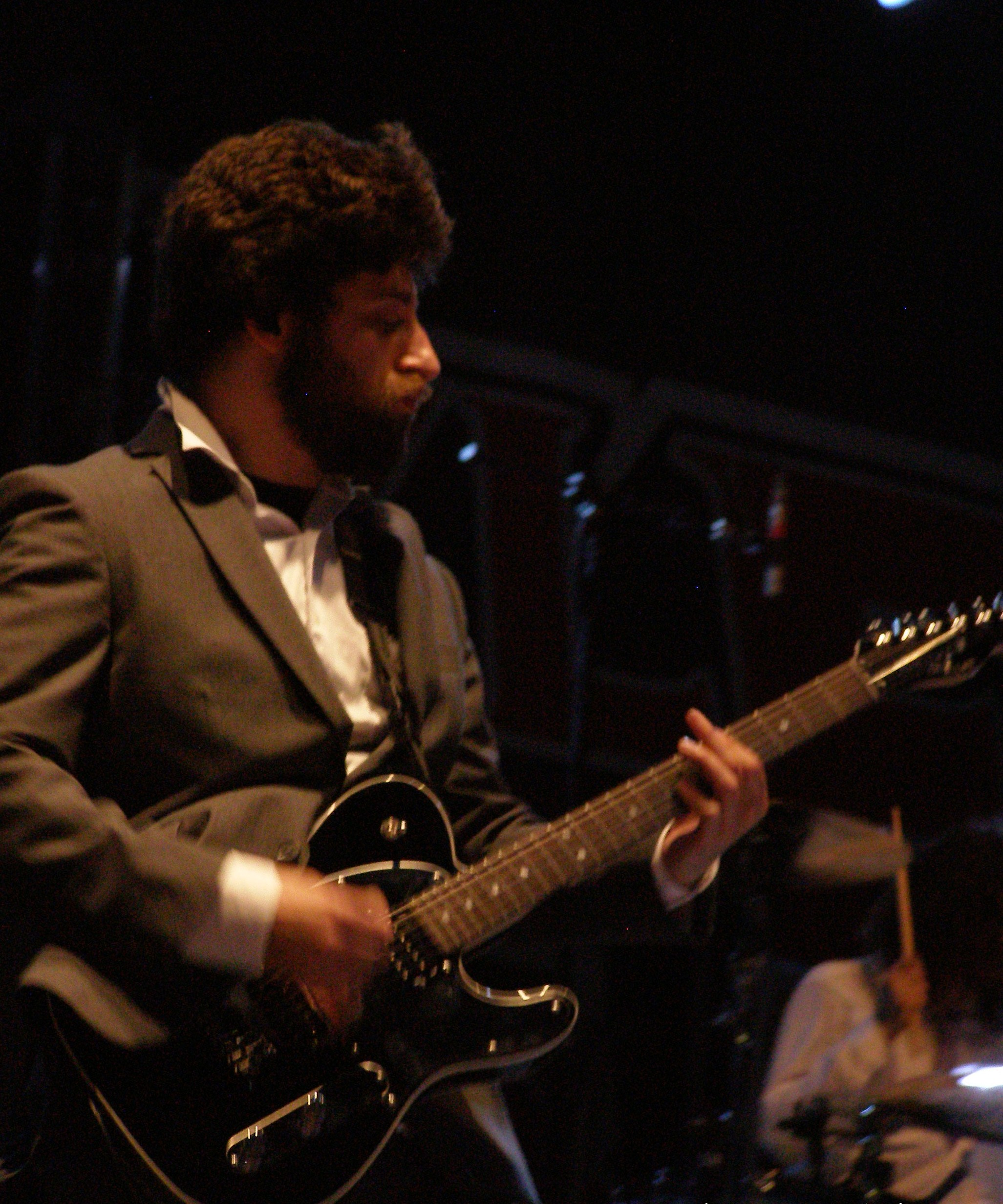
Joe Trohman performing on May 9, 2009, as part of the Believers Never Die Tour Part Deux. The formal attire, which differed from the band's usual wear, was typical of the tour and served as a commentary on corporate America.

The day before Folie à Deux arrived in stores (December 15), Fall Out Boy had planned on staging an impromptu concert in New York City's Washington Square Park. However, the band did not obtain a permit to do so. Taking inspiration from Bob Dylan and similar folk singers from the 1960s, the group wanted to do something free and spontaneous as a gift to fans. The band and its management argued with the NYPD about allowing the show to go on. In the end, they were told that picking up any instruments would earn them a trip to jail, so the band instead led the audience in a sing-along. Stump sang while Wentz and Trohman played air guitar and Hurley drummed on his knees. Stump later commented in an interview that "Those cops back there—and I have no problem with the cops, trust me—but those cops were like the Grinch. They just took all the presents."

On January 20, 2009, Fall Out Boy performed at the 'Be the Change' Youth Ball, which celebrated the inauguration of President Barack Obama. The group was invited to perform by Washington, D.C. mayor Adrian Fenty, who was also a fan of the band. At the ball, the band jokingly dedicated a performance of "Thnks fr th Mmrs" to former president George W. Bush. Upon meeting Obama, Wentz remarked "It's mind-blowing. It's one of those things where it's such an amazing experience—just being in his presence is amazing."

To promote the album, Fall Out Boy embarked on the Believers Never Die Tour Part Deux, which included dates in the United States and Canada. The name of the tour was based on the band's 2004 Believers Never Die Tour. In keeping with the political themes of Folie à Deux, the tour featured symbolic commentary on the current state of corporate America. The group began the sets with a "corporate retreat" in which the group performed in dress suits with policemen in riot gear playing drums by the side of the stage. Afterwards, the band would change to casual attire for the rest of the set. Wentz noted that the purpose of the formal dress was to demonstrate "how the rich rob the poor", and encouraged fans to direct attention to poverty-stricken nations such as Sri Lanka and the Democratic Republic of the Congo.

The supporting acts on the tour were Cobra Starship, All Time Low, Metro Station, and Hey Monday. For five dates on the tour, Fall Out Boy brought along rapper 50 Cent. Wentz explained, "We've been fans of [him] since we heard 'Wanksta' in 8 Mile. We've wanted to do something with him for awhile [sic], and having him out on the tour is gonna take the show to a whole new level. It's exciting to bring two different genres together and give the fans a new experience". The rapper had similar feelings about the situation: "This will be a major moment in music history. Joining forces with Fall Out Boy, one of the most dynamic rock bands in the industry, will be an exciting and historic event for rock and hip-hop." Due to the conflicting fan opinion regarding the album, concertgoers would "boo the band for performing numbers from the record in concert", leaving Stump to describe touring in support of Folie as like "being the last act at the vaudeville show: We were rotten vegetable targets in Clandestine hoods." "Some of us were miserable onstage," said Trohman. "Others were just drunk."

== Legacy ==
Though the band distanced themselves from the album initially, Folie à Deux has seen renewed acclaim in recent years. It has been widely described as ambitious, and "radically different". Stereogum's Annie Zaleski praised the "gigantic leaps in songwriting." In 2023, Stump described their eighth album, So Much for Stardust, as "what would it have sounded like if we had made a record right after Folie instead of taking a break for a few years." For the album's fifteenth anniversary, the band issued "Pavlove", a song only available on deluxe versions of the album, to streaming services for the first time. Additionally, the band released a vinyl reissue, plus merchandise and apparel celebrating the album's anniversary. The same year, the band also resumed performing many of the album's songs live, including "Headfirst Slide" and "Disloyal Order Of Water Buffaloes". "I feel like we’re gonna work some more of it in at future shows," Wentz confirmed.

== Track listing ==
All tracks are written by Fall Out Boy (Andy Hurley, Patrick Stump, Joe Trohman, and Pete Wentz) except where noted

No.	Title	Writer(s)	Length
0.	"Lullabye" (pre-gap hidden track; CD exclusive)		2:00
1.	"Disloyal Order of Water Buffaloes"		4:17
2.	"I Don't Care"	Norman Greenbaum; Hurley; Stump; Trohman; Wentz	3:34
3.	"She's My Winona"		3:51
4.	"America's Suitehearts"		3:34
5.	"Headfirst Slide into Cooperstown on a Bad Bet"		3:54
6.	"The (Shipped) Gold Standard"		3:19
7.	"(Coffee's for Closers)"		4:35
8.	"What a Catch, Donnie" (features uncredited vocals from William Beckett, Elvis Costello, Alexander DeLeon, Travie McCoy, Doug Neumann, Gabe Saporta, and Brendon Urie)		4:51
9.	"27"		3:12
10.	"Tiffany Blews" (features uncredited vocals from Alexander DeLeon and Lil Wayne)		3:44
11.	"W.A.M.S."	Hurley; Stump; Trohman; Pharrell Williams; Wentz	4:38
12.	"20 Dollar Nose Bleed" (features uncredited vocals from Brendon Urie)		4:17
13.	"West Coast Smoker" (features uncredited vocals from Debbie Harry)		2:46
Total length:			50:32

Deluxe edition
No.	Title	Writer(s)	Length
14.	"I Don't Care" (Machine Shop Remix)	Greenbaum; Hurley; Stump; Trohman; Wentz	3:03
15.	"America's Suitehearts" (South Rakkas Remix)		3:40
16.	"Pavlove"		3:34
17.	"America's Suitehearts" (acoustic)		3:40
18.	"What a Catch, Donnie" (acoustic)		4:01

Australian / New Zealand deluxe edition
No.	Title	Writer(s)	Length
19.	"Beat It" (Michael Jackson cover, featuring John Mayer)	Michael Jackson	3:48

Japanese edition
No.	Title	Writer(s)	Length
14.	"Pavlove"		3:35
15.	"I Don't Care" (acoustic)	Greenbaum; Hurley; Stump; Trohman; Wentz	3:44
16.	"Beat It" (featuring John Mayer)	Jackson	3:48

Japanese edition bonus DVD
No.	Title	Writer(s)	Length
1.	"I Don't Care" (music video)	Greenbaum; Hurley; Stump; Trohman; Wentz	4:28
2.	"America's Suitehearts" (music video)		3:44
3.	"Beat It" (music video)	Jackson	3:50
4.	"Headfirst Slide into Cooperstown on a Bad Bet" (live at the Nokia Theater NYC)		4:23
5.	"Sugar, We're Goin Down" (live at the Nokia Theater NYC)		3:41
6.	"Dance, Dance" (live at the Nokia Theater NYC)		3:23
7.	"Behind the Scenes in Japan"		14:21

UK / Latin American edition
No.	Title	Writer(s)	Length
14.	"Beat It" (featuring John Mayer)	Jackson	3:48

iTunes deluxe edition
No.	Title	Writer(s)	Length
14.	"I Don't Care" (Cobra Starship Suave Suarez Remix)	Greenbaum; Hurley; Stump; Trohman; Wentz	3:11
15.	"I Don't Care" (music video)	Greenbaum; Hurley; Stump; Trohman; Wentz	4:27

Note

- "W.A.M.S." is stylized in lowercase and is an acronym for "Waiter Actress Model Singer".

== Personnel ==
Fall Out Boy

- Patrick Stump – lead vocals, rhythm guitar, piano
- Joe Trohman – lead guitar
- Pete Wentz – bass guitar, unclean vocals on "20 Dollar Nose Bleed" and "West Coast Smoker"
- Andy Hurley – drums

Guest artists

- William Beckett, Elvis Costello, Travie McCoy, Doug Neumann, and Gabe Saporta – guest vocals on "What a Catch, Donnie"
- Brendon Urie – guest vocals on "What a Catch, Donnie"; piano and guest vocals on "20 Dollar Nose Bleed".
- Alexander DeLeon – guest vocals on "What a Catch, Donnie" and "Tiffany Blews"
- Lil Wayne – guest vocals on "Tiffany Blews"
- Pharrell Williams – synthesizer on "w.a.m.s."
- Debbie Harry – guest vocals on "West Coast Smoker"

Artwork

- Pamela Littky – photography
- Fall Out Boy – art direction
- Andy West – album design
- JP Robinson – art coordination
- Luke Chueh – cover artwork
- Ronald Kurniawan – inside artwork

Production

- Neal Avron – producer, mixing
- Pharrell Williams – producer on "w.a.m.s."
- Erich Talaba – engineer, Pro Tools
- Ted Jensen – mastering
- Andrew Coleman – recording
- Ryan Kennedy – assistant recording
- Nicolas Fournier – mixing assistant
- Kiki Cholewka, Bob Mallory, and Zephyrus Sowers – assistant engineers

== Charts ==
=== Weekly charts ===
Weekly chart performance for Folie à Deux
Chart (2008–2009)	Peak position
Australian Albums (ARIA)	9
Austrian Albums (Ö3 Austria)	64
Belgian Albums (Ultratop Flanders)	40
Belgian Albums (Ultratop Wallonia)	65
Canadian Albums (Billboard)	21
Dutch Albums (Album Top 100)	79
French Albums (SNEP)	41
German Albums (Offizielle Top 100)	48
Irish Albums (IRMA)	52
Japanese Albums (Oricon)	6
Mexican Albums (AMPROFON)	31
New Zealand Albums (RMNZ)	26
Scottish Albums (Official Charts)	35
Swiss Albums (Schweizer Hitparade)	84
UK Albums (Official Charts)	39
US Billboard 200	8
US Top Alternative Albums (Billboard)	3
US Top Rock Albums (Billboard)	3
US Indie Store Album Sales (Billboard)	5

=== Year-end charts ===
2008 year-end chart performance for Folie à Deux
Chart (2008)	Position
Australian Albums (ARIA)	82

2009 year-end chart performance for Folie à Deux
Chart (2009)	Position
Australian Albums (ARIA)	94
US Billboard 200	81
US Top Rock Albums (Billboard)	26

== Certifications ==
Certifications for Folie à Deux
Region	Certification	Certified units/sales
Australia (ARIA)	Platinum	70,000^{^}
New Zealand (RMNZ)	Gold	7,500^{^}
United Kingdom (BPI)	Gold	100,000^{^}
United States (RIAA)	Platinum	1,000,000^{‡}
^{^} Shipments figures based on certification alone.^{‡} Sales+streaming figures based on certification alone.

== Release history ==
Release dates and formats for Folie à Deux
Country	Date	Label
Japan	December 10, 2008	Island
Australia	December 13, 2008	Island
United Kingdom	December 15, 2008	Mercury
United States	December 16, 2008	Island
