= Perlow =

Perlow is a surname. Notable people with the surname include:

- Aharon Perlow (1839–1897), third Rebbe of Koidanov
- Gilbert Jerome Perlow (1916–2007), American physicist
- Leslie Perlow, American economist
- Yaakov Perlow (1931–2020), Novominsker Rebbe
