= Welcome to the New Administration =

CitizensFOB Mixtape: Welcome to the New Administration

Mixtape by Fall Out Boy
- Released: August 18, 2008
- Recorded: 2007–08
- Length: 44:46
- Label: Decaydance
- Producer: Clinton Sparks (host); Pete Wentz; Patrick Stump

Fall Out Boy chronology
Live in Phoenix (2008)	CitizensFOB Mixtape: Welcome to the New Administration (2008)	Folie à Deux (2008)

Welcome to the New Administration was a viral campaign and mixtape launched by Fall Out Boy bass guitarist Pete Wentz on August 18, 2008 to promote what is now known to be the group's fourth studio album, Folie à Deux. The mixtape was made available to stream and download on November 4, 2008, containing snippets and demos from Fall Out Boy as well as various Decaydance artists.

== Origins ==
The campaign started when the website for Decaydance Records was supposedly "hacked" by an organization called "Citizens For Our Betterment". A posted link led to the organization's website which was decorated in the colors of the American flag. Links on the page were met with dead ends, requiring specific IP addresses to access their destinations. A post counter was displayed on the page with the number 59,994. Wentz left clues on his personal blog that the 60,000th would reveal something big. The Decaydance site returned to normal the following day. On August 19, his then-wife, Ashlee Simpson, was seen carrying a pamphlet for the organization, raising suspicion and sparking many rumors online. New posts appeared on the Citizens for Our Betterment web page everyday, many referring to November 4, the same day as the 2008 US presidential election. Also, Wentz posted more clues on his blog. More and more links were opened to the public as well.

On August 24, one such link led to a page saying "FOB - The Return - November Four" in large Stencil font, causing many to believe that Fall Out Boy would release their new album on November 4. Others theorized that this was another one of Wentz's attempts to raise political awareness, as he did by previously holding a rally for then-US Democratic Party presidential candidate, Barack Obama. Also, many Fueled by Ramen bands posted MySpace bulletins that same day with the title "Welcome to the New Administration". Every bulletin contained one word—"ten". Finally, on August 25, 2008, the Citizens for Our Betterment website was redirected to the band's Friends or Enemies page, which displayed an image of a voting booth featuring ballots with the names of several Decaydance artists. By clicking on each individual ballot, there is an audio clip from the respective artist reciting passages from past posts on the Citizens for Our Betterment website. A mixtape was also made available for download called Welcome to the New Administration that included songs from several Decaydance bands and an interlude by Ludacris announcing that Folie à Deux would be released on November 4. The album's release date however, was delayed until December 10, 2008 in the US.

== Track listing ==
No.	Title	Artist	Length
1.	"Intro"	Guy Ripley	0:40
2.	"Interlude"	Ludacris	0:40
3.	"ALPHAdog and OMEGAlomaniac" (demo)	Fall Out Boy	2:09
4.	"Lake Effect Kid" (demo)	Fall Out Boy	3:37
5.	"I Don't Care (27)" (demo/snippet)	Fall Out Boy (featuring Clinton Sparks & Seth Green)	1:09
6.	"Catch Me If You Can/Proclamation of Emancipation" (demo mashup)	Fall Out Boy (featuring Travis from Gym Class Heroes)	2:51
7.	"Bounce" (snippet)	The Cab	1:25
8.	"First Timers"	Tyga (featuring Evan from the Black List Club)	2:31
9.	"Northern Downpour" (snippet)	Panic! at the Disco	2:02
10.	"Nearly Witches" (demo)	The Paul Revere Jumpsuit Apparatus AKA Panic! at the Disco	0:58
11.	"I Kissed a Boy"	Cobra Starship	3:01
12.	"Automatic Eyes" (Suave Suarez remix)	The Academy Is... (featuring Tyga)	2:40
13.	"Homecoming" (snippet)	Hey Monday	1:07
14.	"Take My Hand" (Machine Shop Production)	The Cab (featuring Cassadee Pope of Hey Monday)	3:38
15.	"California Girls" (demo)	Tyga	2:47
16.	"Cookie Jar" (snippet)	Gym Class Heroes	2:02
17.	"Oh, Dakota" (acoustic demo)	A Rocket to the Moon	1:14
18.	"Bada Bing! Wit a Pipe!"	Four Year Strong	3:26
19.	"Text Fall Out Boy: FOB to 66937" (interlude - signup and instant betterment)	Clinton Sparks	0:15
20.	"About a Girl" (snippet)	The Academy Is...	0:53
21.	"We Believe In (Barack Obama)"	The Hush Sound	1:52
22.	"Interlude"	The Hush Sound	0:24
23.	"Mixtape" (snippet)	Butch Walker	0:28
24.	"Interlude"	Cobra Starship	1:46
25.	"America's Suitehearts" (demo/snippet)	Fall Out Boy	0:37
26.	"Outro"	Clinton Sparks & Pete Wentz	0:34
