= Time affluence =

Availability of spare time

Time affluence is defined as the sense that one has ample time available on a daily basis.

== History ==
Tim Kasser is credited with coining the term. In 2009, Kasser published a co-authored paper with Kennon Sheldon in which they used the term "time affluence" and shared the results from four related empirical studies. All four studies indicated time affluence had positive impacts on well-being.

Prior to Kasser and Sheldon's studies, generations of scholars and authors have studied and written about time in general. Many of these studies can be found under the category time-use research, an interdisciplinary field of study.

== Time affluence and well-being ==
Much of the research about time affluence has indicated a positive relationship between having ample time on a daily basis and improved well-being. For example, Kasser and Sheldon's 2009 paper reported that individuals with more time affluence were more likely to enjoy the present moment, experience feelings of autonomy and competence, engage in more intimate relationships, and pursue activities related to personal development, connections with others, and physical fitness. More recently, Schaupp and Geiger published findings from a quasi-experimental longitudinal study with 96 participants, reporting that mindfulness can increase perceived time affluence and, subsequently, subjective well-being.

== Related concepts ==
Time confetti, time famine, and time poverty are all related concepts. Although the latter two terms are sometimes used interchangeably, they describe different phenomena.

=== Time confetti ===
Time confetti is a term coined by Brigid Schulte in her book Overwhelmed: Work, Love & Play when No One has the Time. Schulte uses this term as an analogy to describe how people today constantly switch between perceived obligations, managing time ineffectively due to both stress and never-ending to-do lists: a practice that results in the inability to perform any given task well. In other words, we are left with small, fragmented amounts of time due to unproductive multitasking. Schulte and others cite increasing use of digital technologies as the primary contributing factor.

=== Time famine ===
Time famine is a related concept first introduced by Leslie Perlow in 1999. Time famine is defined as the sense that one has when there is too much to do and not enough time available to do it. In Perlow's ethnographic research about a software engineering team, she found they often struggled to complete individual work due to constant interruptions. Perlow noted that, coupled with the pressure to meet deadlines and a culture that rewarded individuals who resolved crises, the engineers were caught in a vicious cycle when it came to how they felt about the tasks they needed to do and the time available.

=== Time poverty ===
Time poverty is another related concept. It's defined as one not having enough time due to shouldering extra work, burdens, and/or obligations outside of paid work, such as being the primary caregiver for a child. Time poverty is also often used to describe situations in which people have to work long hours for pay and have no choice but to do otherwise. Studies report that, overall, time poverty disproportionately impacts women and is linked with lower well-being, physical health, and productivity.

== See also ==
- Subjective vitality
