= America's Suitehearts =

Single by Fall Out Boy

from the album Folie à Deux
- Released: December 8, 2008
- Recorded: Los Angeles, CA
- Length: 3:34
- Label: Island
- Songwriters: Pete Wentz; Patrick Stump; Joe Trohman; Andy Hurley
- Producer: Neal Avron

Fall Out Boy singles chronology
"I Don't Care" (2008)	"America's Suitehearts" (2008)	"Headfirst Slide into Cooperstown on a Bad Bet" (2009)

Music video
- "America's Suitehearts" on YouTube

"America's Suitehearts"
The song contains stacked vocals that have been compared to groups such as the Beatles and Electric Light Orchestra, while featuring elements of soul music.

"America's Suitehearts" is a song by American rock band Fall Out Boy and the second single taken from their fourth studio album, Folie à Deux (2008). Initially released to iTunes in promotion before the album's release, "America's Suitehearts" was later serviced to radio on January 20, 2009. A demo/snippet titled "America's Sweethearts" was included on the band's mixtape, Welcome to the New Administration, as part of their viral campaign in promotion of their record. The music video was unveiled at 3PM on January 1, 2009 on The N. Bassist/lyricist Pete Wentz commented that the song was about society's fixation with celebrities. The music was composed by vocalist/guitarist Patrick Stump.

The song has been performed on Late Night with Conan O'Brien, at the MTV Inaugural Celebration and in February 2009 on The Ellen DeGeneres Show.

The song debuted at No. 44 in late December 2008 in Australia on the ARIA Singles Chart, and in early 2009 reached its peak of No. 26, becoming the seventh consecutive top 30 single for Fall Out Boy in that region. "America's Suitehearts" also debuted at No. 78 on the Billboard Hot 100 in the United States, and received minor pop radio airplay to reach No. 30 on Pop Songs but failed to place on Alternative Songs. It peaked at No. 76 on the UK Singles Chart.

The backing vocals in the song have been compared to groups such as the Beatles.

== Music video ==
The video for the song, released January 6, 2009, involves various people being drastically changed by the media and paparazzi, which is what the song is said to be about. Hey Monday lead singer Cassadee Pope makes an appearance in the video. Clips of the band performing in exaggerated circus costumes on a carousel are shown throughout the video.

Wentz also stated that the music video was inspired by director Federico Fellini, as well as the film Who Framed Roger Rabbit.

Each band member's costume represents a character from various lyrics on Folie à Deux:

- Stump: Dr. Benzedrine (Mr. Benzedrine from "20 Dollar Nose Bleed")
- Wentz: Mr. Sandman (from "Headfirst Slide into Cooperstown on a Bad Bet")
- Hurley: Donnie the Catcher (from "What a Catch, Donnie")
- Trohman: Horse Shoe Crab (from "The (Shipped) Gold Standard")

== Remix ==
On March 30, the official remix, called the hip-hop remix, leaked out featuring rappers Joe Budden, 88-Keys and Murs. In the song, the rappers discuss the politics of the music industry, with Fall Out Boy vocalist Patrick Stump singing the chorus. Another remix leaked soon after which featured Lil Wayne as well as a remix made by Mark Hoppus. The Mark Hoppus remix appears on the EP America's Suitehearts: Remixed, Retouched, Rehabbed and Retoxed.

== Track listing ==
Lyrics written by bassist/backing vocalist Pete Wentz; music composed by Fall Out Boy.

Digital download

No.	Title	Length
1.	"America's Suitehearts" (album version)	3:40

CD single

No.	Title	Length
1.	"America's Suitehearts" (single version)	3:40
2.	"I Don't Care" (acoustic version)	3:43

== Charts ==
Chart (2008–09)	Peak position
Australian Singles Chart	26
UK Singles Chart	76
US Billboard Hot 100	78
US Pop Airplay (Billboard)	30

== Certifications ==
Region	Certification	Certified units/sales
United States (RIAA)	Gold	500,000^{‡}
^{‡} Sales+streaming figures based on certification alone.

== Release history ==
Release dates and formats for "America's Suitehearts"
Region	Date	Format	Label(s)	Ref.
United States	January 20, 2009	Mainstream airplay	Island	
