= Brigid Schulte =

American journalist and author

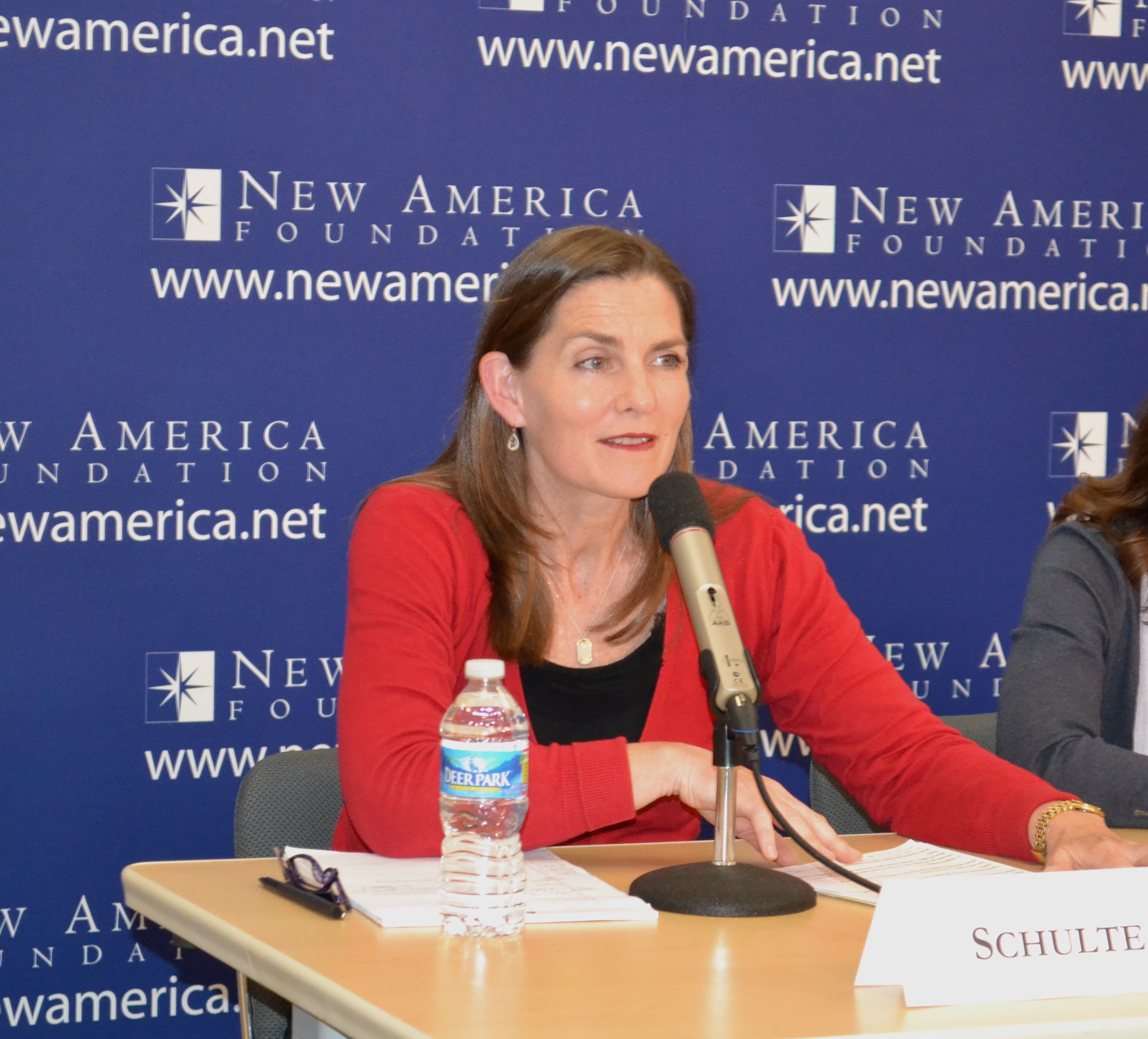
- Schulte in 2013
- Born: Brigid Frances Schulte; May 27, 1962 (age 64); Eugene, Oregon
- Education: Columbia University (M.S.); University of Portland (B.A.)
- Occupations: Journalist, author
- Spouse: Tom Bowman
- Children: 2
- Writing career
- Genre: non-fiction
- Notable awards: Abe Fellowship for Journalists, 2018; Pulitzer Prize, 2008
- Website: brigidschulte.com

Brigid Schulte is an American journalist, New York Times bestselling author, keynote speaker, and director of the Better Life Lab at New America.

== Career ==
Schulte was a staff writer for The Washington Post for nearly 17 years and was part of the team that won a Pulitzer Prize in 2008.

In 2014, Schulte published her book Overwhelmed: Work, Love & Play when No One has the Time. Overwhelmed won the Virginia Library Association’s literary nonfiction award, and was translated into a number of languages. In the book, Schulte coined the term time confetti.

Since 2015, Schulte has been the director of the Better Life Lab at nonpartisan think tank New America, advocating for work-family justice and gender equity through original research and reporting.

She hosts the Better Life Lab podcast, an Apple Top 50 podcast exploring the art and science of living a full and healthy life, and the future of work, care, and wellbeing.

Schulte's work has appeared in The New York Times, Harvard Business Review, Financial Times, Slate, Vox, The Atlantic, The Boston Globe, New York Magazine, Fast Company, Time, CNN, Quartz, The Guardian, and Washington Monthly, among others.

She has been quoted as an expert or featured in numerous publications, including Fortune, Financial Times and others, and has appeared on a number of TV and radio programs, including CNN, the BBC, NBC and MSNBC, Fresh Air with Terry Gross and NPR’s Morning Edition.

Her second book, Over Work: Transforming the Daily Grind in the Quest for a Better Life was published by Henry Holt and Company in September 2024.

== Books ==
- Overwhelmed: Work, Love & Play when No One has the Time. New York: Sarah Crichton Books, Farrar, Straus and Giroux, 2014. ISBN 9781429945875
- Over Work: Transforming the Daily Grind in the Quest for a Better Life. New York: Henry Holt and Co., 2024. ISBN 9781250801722

== Personal life ==
Schulte lives in Alexandria, Virginia, with her husband, NPR journalist Tom Bowman, and their two children.
