= Tom Bowman (journalist) =

American radio journalist

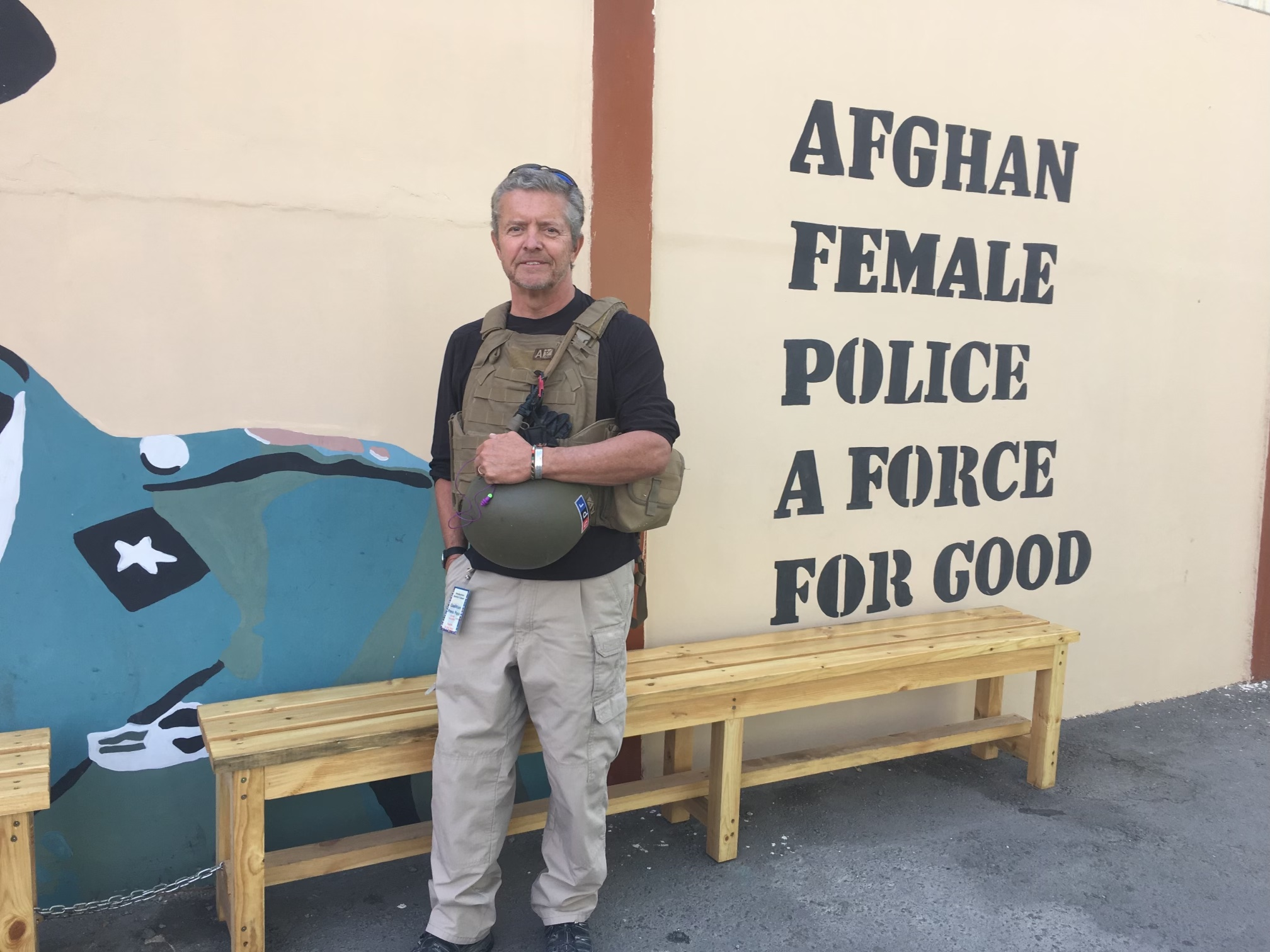
- Bowman in Kabul, Afghanistan, 2017
- Born: Thomas Michael Bowman; May 24, 1955 (age 71); Norwood, Massachusetts
- Education: Boston College (M.A.); Saint Michael's College (B.A.)
- Occupation: Reporter
- Notable credit(s): National Public Radio; The Baltimore Sun
- Spouse: Brigid Schulte
- Children: 2

Tom Bowman is National Public Radio's Pentagon reporter, having been a reporter for the Baltimore Sun for 19 years prior to that.

== Education ==
He attended Saint Michael's College in Vermont, receiving a bachelor's degree in history, and then received a master's degree in American studies from Boston College.

== Career ==
Bowman grew up in Norwood, Massachusetts. He started his newspaper career in 1976 as a stringer for The Patriot Ledger in Quincy, Massachusetts.

He became The Baltimore Sun's military affairs correspondent in 1997, after having covered the U.S. Naval Academy in Annapolis and the National Security Agency. He became the Pentagon correspondent for NPR in 2006. He has reported from Afghanistan, Syria, and Iraq.

In 2023, Bowman co-hosted NPR Embedded podcast Taking Cover, investigating a U.S. Marine friendly fire incident in Fallujah, Iraq, a finalist for the Alfred I. duPont–Columbia University Award.

== Personal life ==
Bowman presently lives in Alexandria, Virginia, with his wife Brigid Schulte, an author and former Washington Post reporter, and their children, Liam and Tessa.

== Awards ==
Bowman received the 2006 National Headliners' Award for his coverage on the lack of advanced tourniquets for U.S. troops in Iraq.

In 2010, he received an Edward R. Murrow Award for his coverage of a Taliban roadside bomb attack on an Army unit.

In 2024, Bowman received a Murrow Award in Investigative Reporting for NPR podcast Taking Cover.
