= America's Suitehearts: Remixed, Retouched, Rehabbed and Retoxed =

EP by Fall Out Boy
- Released: April 27, 2009
- Length: 12:53 (with music video)
- Label: Island
- Producers: Mark Hoppus; Neal Avron

Fall Out Boy chronology
Folie à Deux (2008)	America's Suitehearts: Remixed, Retouched, Rehabbed and Retoxed (2009)	Believers Never Die – Greatest Hits (2009)

America's Suitehearts: Remixed, Retouched, Rehabbed and Retoxed is a digital EP by American rock band Fall Out Boy, released on April 27, 2009. It contains a remix of the second single "America's Suitehearts" from their fourth studio album Folie à Deux (2008) that was remixed and produced by blink-182 singer and bassist Mark Hoppus, an acoustic version of America's Suitehearts, "Lullabye", the pregap hidden track from Folie à Deux, and the music video for "America's Suitehearts".

== Track listing ==
No.	Title	Length
1.	"America's Suitehearts" (Mark Hoppus Remix)	3:35
2.	"America's Suitehearts" (acoustic)	3:38
3.	"Lullabye"	1:56
4.	"America's Suitehearts" (music video)	3:44
Total length:		12:53
