= Headfirst Slide into Cooperstown on a Bad Bet =

2009 single by Fall Out Boy

Single by Fall Out Boy

from the album Folie à Deux
- Released: June 15, 2009
- Recorded: Los Angeles, California
- Genre: Alternative rock; pop-punk
- Length: 3:55
- Label: Island
- Songwriter(s): Pete Wentz; Patrick Stump; Joe Trohman; Andy Hurley
- Producer(s): Neal Avron

Fall Out Boy singles chronology
"America's Suitehearts" (2008)	"Headfirst Slide into Cooperstown on a Bad Bet" (2009)	"What a Catch, Donnie" (2009)

"Headfirst Slide into Cooperstown on a Bad Bet" is a song by the American rock band Fall Out Boy from their fourth studio album Folie à Deux (2008). It was initially released as a digital single as part of the buildup to the new album on iTunes on October 7, 2008. The song impacted United States modern rock radio on June 15, 2009.

The title of the song refers to former Major League Baseball player Pete Rose, known for sliding headfirst into bases. Rose agreed never to work in baseball again due to an accused betting scandal while managing the Cincinnati Reds and will likely be kept out of the Hall of Fame, located in Cooperstown, New York, because of it. The band originally intended to name-drop Rose in the song's title. They changed their minds because of concerns about the lawsuit brought against OutKast over their 1999 single "Rosa Parks" by the civil rights activist, who was name-dropped in the title. "Headfirst" had the working title "Does Your Husband Know?"

Chronologically, "What a Catch, Donnie" and "America's Suitehearts" were released to iTunes after "Headfirst Slide into Cooperstown on a Bad Bet". However, "Headfirst Slide..." was never serviced to radio as an official single, while the former two were later released as radio singles, albeit in vice versa order.

== Composition ==
Vocalist/guitarist Patrick Stump once again composed the music, using musical style as a palette to support bassist Pete Wentz's lyrics. In an interview with MTV, Stump said of the song:

[It] struts in on a massive drum line and crunching, processed guitars, gets amplified by a four-piece horn section, then falls away to a simple, somber piano line. It's sexual one minute, heartbreaking the next — the perfect accompaniment for Wentz's tale of infidelity and deception. Swagger is a great way to describe it, because on the song, he's lyrically adopting a character that has swagger, so I wanted the music to have that swagger. The verse is so confident and funky and forward because the lyric is so full of itself. And then everything stops, and there's a piano breakdown, and it's very melancholy and sad and theatrical, and the lyric shifts to the doubt that's behind all that arrogance. And ultimately, I wanted the music — in conjunction with the lyric — to express that arrogance is usually a mask for terrible insecurity. -- vocalist/composer/guitarist Patrick Stump on the composition of "Headfirst Slide into Cooperstown on a Bad Bet."

== Music video ==
On August 28, 2009, the music video was released on director Shane Valdez's Vimeo account as well as Decaydance's (now DCD2) and Friends or Enemies' official YouTube accounts. A preview of the video was released on AbsolutePunk.net the week earlier. The title of the music video, "A Weekend at Pete Rose's," is a reference to the 1989 dark comedy Weekend at Bernie's and former Major League Baseball player Pete Rose.

The entirety of the music video was shot in the beachfront city Santa Monica, California. A portion of the video was filmed at Pacific Park.

The video opens with Brendon Urie and Spencer Smith from Panic! at the Disco jogging and discussing their favorite '80s films. They head to the beach where they expect to meet with Pete Wentz from Fall Out Boy. They find Wentz on the shore and realize he is dead. Urie wishes to call the police, but Smith convinces him otherwise. The two drag Wentz's body to his SUV, and they drive into town and walk around with the body. To make it seem like Wentz is alive, Urie and Smith hold his arms to make him wave and tie his shoe laces to their own while they walk. Later in the day, they decide that Wentz is "too much dead weight." They go to a carnival, and afterwards they leave his body outside the fairgrounds. They take his hat and hoodie and thank him for his cell phone, money, and "memories" (a reference to an earlier Fall Out Boy single, "Thnks fr th Mmrs").

During the credits of the video, Urie and Smith hum the ending theme to Jurassic Park.

== Chart performance ==
Chart (2008)	Peak position
Canada (Canadian Hot 100)	64
US Billboard Hot 100	74
