= Tim Kasser =

American psychologist and book author

Tim Kasser (August 1, 1966) is an American psychologist and book author known for his work on materialism and well-being.

== Career ==
Kasser received his Ph.D. in psychology from the University of Rochester in 1994, and after one additional year of teaching at Montana State University, he accepted a position at Knox College in Galesburg, Illinois, where he was a professor of psychology. He retired from Knox in 2019 and was named Emeritus Professor.

He has authored over 120 scientific articles and book chapters on materialism, values, goals, well-being, and environmental sustainability, among other topics. His first book, The High Price of Materialism, was published in 2002 (ISBN 978-0262611978); his second book (co-edited with Allen D. Kanner), Psychology and Consumer Culture, was released in 2004. In 2009 he co-authored a book (with Tom Crompton) Meeting Environmental Challenges: The Role of Human Identity. In 2013 he wrote Lucy in the Mind of Lennon, a psychological biography that explores the meaning of John Lennon's song, Lucy in the Sky with Diamonds. Most recently, in 2018, he collaborated with the cartoonist Larry Gonick on HyperCapitalism: The modern economy, its values, and how to change them. Kasser's books have been translated into twelve languages.

Since the early 2000s, Kasser has consulted with activist and civil-society organizations who work against the commercialization of children and who work towards a more inwardly rich lifestyle than what is offered by consumerism. While at Knox College, Kasser lived with his wife, two sons, and assorted animals in the western Illinois countryside; he now lives in the Southern Tier region of New York state.

== Wellbeing ==
Kasser initiated a line of research showing that people who pursue intrinsic goals for personal growth, affiliation, and community feeling report higher well-being than those focused on extrinsic goals for money, image, and status.

== Select publications ==
- Kasser, T. in Human Autonomy in Cross-Cultural Context (Chirkov, VI; Ryan, RM & Sheldon, KM, eds), Capitalism and autonomy, 191-206 (Springer, Netherlands, 2011).
- Kasser, Tim; Crompton, Tom; Linn, Susan (March 2010). "Children, commercialism and environmental sustainability". Solutions. 1 (2): 14–17. Archived from the original on June 15, 2012.
- Kasser, T, Cohn, S, Kanner, AD, & Ryan, RM. Some costs of American corporate capitalism: a psychological exploration of value and goal conflicts. Psychological Inquiry 18, 1–22 (2007).
- Kasser, T, Ryan, RM, Couchman, CE & Sheldon, KM in Psychology and Consumer Culture: The Struggle for a Good Life in a Materialistic World (Kasser, T & Kanner, AD, eds), Materialistic values: Their causes and consequences, 11–28 (American Psychological Association, Washington, DC, 2004).

== See also ==
- Anti-consumerism
- Cultural Creatives
- Economic materialism
- Post-materialism
- Time affluence
- Voluntary simplicity
