= I Don't Care (Fall Out Boy song) =

Single by Fall Out Boy

from the album Folie à Deux
- Released: September 3, 2008
- Recorded: Los Angeles, California, U.S.
- Genre: Arena rock; rockabilly; blues
- Length: 3:38
- Label: Island
- Songwriters: Pete Wentz; Patrick Stump; Joe Trohman; Andy Hurley; Norman Greenbaum
- Producer: Neal Avron

Fall Out Boy singles chronology
"Beat It" (2008)	"I Don't Care" (2008)	"America's Suitehearts" (2009)

Music video
- "I Don't Care" on YouTube

"I Don't Care" is a song by American rock band Fall Out Boy and the lead single from the group's fourth studio album Folie à Deux in 2008. It was first available for listening on the band's website on September 3, 2008. The song impacted radio on September 16. It is its album's best known song, being certified two-times platinum by the Recording Industry Association of America (RIAA), denoting shipments of two million units, with over 500,000 sales in its first four months alone. In the United States, the song reached No. 21 on the Billboard Hot 100, placing lower than the No. 2 lead single, "This Ain't a Scene, It's an Arms Race", of the band's previous 2007 album Infinity on High. It received radio play at Modern Rock and Pop stations, charting at No. 21 on Billboard's Hot Modern Rock Tracks and No. 22 on Pop Songs.

The song has been described as a very political track by Patrick Stump, the lead vocalist and guitarist of the band, but not political in the traditional sense; more about the politics of a relationship. Stump has said that this song is about the superficiality and selfishness that is associated with pop culture. The song was ranked No. 68 on Rolling Stone's list of the 100 Best Songs of 2008.

== Music ==
"I Don't Care"
The song has been compared to both arena rock and blues styles of music. Guitarist Joe Trohman described the song's guitar work as "our take on a ZZ Top riff".

"Like the chorus says, 'I don't care what you think as long as it's about me.' It's that pop culture thing again, where people don't care about anything but the superficial, and I think there's something so tragic about that. I also thought there was something so ironically anthemic about the chorus, where it's not something you want to sing along to, because it's vacuous and empty. So I wanted something really anthemic underneath it, like something you'd hear at sports games or whatever, because I wanted people to hear it and be confronted with how empty that is. I didn't want anything to be superficial on this record unless the point was to point out superficiality." -- Patrick Stump on the song's message.

Wentz referred to "I Don't Care" as a "narcissist's anthem", further commenting that "To me, it's like a YouTube anthem for the YouTube generation, just about how our attention span is about seven seconds...[it asks,] 'Why can't we get people to pay attention for two minutes and 35 seconds?'"

"I Don't Care" has been described as "disco rockabilly", and contains a repeating blues riff throughout the song; Stump's vocal performance on the track has been compared to John Lee Hooker.

== Music video ==
The music video was released on iTunes on September 25, 2008. It was then uploaded to YouTube the next day by Fall Out Boy via the group's YouTube channel. The video was directed by Alan Ferguson.

Guns N' Roses alum Gilby Clarke opens the video by greeting the band members as they enter the green room of a French-language talk show. They sit down, then Clarke turns to a companion and blurts out, "What the hell happened to rock and roll? Eyeliner? Energy drinks? And no guitar solos? I've taken shits with bigger rock stars than them!" As the video progresses, the band members are then shown in various scenes causing trouble on the streets of Los Angeles—harassing street performers, shoplifting disguised as nuns, pelting people with water balloons, urinating in the street—interspersed with clips of the band performing. During this footage, a graphic of a cat eating spaghetti appears abruptly, alluding to an incident on The Morning Show with Mike and Juliet, where producers used the same graphic to censor out obscene gestures by a guest. The rapper Tyga appears in the video. Near the end of the video, the band members peel off their masks to reveal their hidden identities: Andy Hurley turns out to be Mark Hoppus, Patrick Stump is Pharrell Williams, Joe Trohman is Gabe Saporta, and Pete Wentz is Spencer Pratt. Meanwhile, a hustling woman celebrity shown earlier in the video pulls off her mask and shows herself to be Pete in a dress. Viewers are returned to the green room, where Clarke, still mocking the band, tears off his mask and reveals himself as Sarah Palin, who gives Palin's trademark wink to the audience as the video ends.

When asked about his view on the video, Wentz replied:

It's a series of vignettes, and in the end, the joke is: Everyone in the world who is famous is just a WWE character. And some of you are Hulk Hogan, and some of you are The Undertaker, and it's awesome. It's just as great to come out to the boos. This one is about portraying the band, too, because there's been videos where it's been about individual characters, and this one is really a band-based video. Everyone has really equal face time, and there's a communist aspect to the video in the imagery, but we're also trying to [make] something that's equal.

=== Criticism ===
Bassist Pete Wentz posted a blog expressing dissatisfaction about the product placement in the edited iTunes music video that was not approved by the band: "The version of the video that we worked on night after night is not the version that aired, yet somehow a cut full of glorious camera-phone shots did [...] It doesn't make any sense to us. [...] Imagine seeing this edit only after you buy the video off of iTunes and realizing that no one even had the balls to call you and tell you they were changing the video and cutting parts." Later in his blog post, Wentz explained that "this will probably end up deleted by me or someone else", and by the next morning, the post was later replaced with an image of Popeye and Bluto, with the word "censored" taped across their mouths. The iTunes version of the album released the original version as a bonus video.

== Track listing ==
Lyrics written by bassist/backing vocalist Pete Wentz; music composed by Fall Out Boy and Norman Greenbaum.

UK two-track CD single

1. "I Don't Care" (album version) – 3:38
2. "I Don't Care" (Cobra Starship Suave Suarez Remix) – 3:11

== Charts ==
=== Weekly charts ===
Chart (2008–09)	Peak position
Australia (ARIA)	20
Austria (Ö3 Austria Top 40)	73
Belgium (Ultratip Bubbling Under Flanders)	15
Belgium (Ultratip Bubbling Under Wallonia)	12
Canada Hot 100 (Billboard)	35
Finland (Suomen virallinen lista)	17
Germany (GfK)	62
Ireland (IRMA)	31
Scottish Singles Sales (Official Charts)	12
UK Singles (Official Charts)	33
US Billboard Hot 100	21
US Adult Pop Airplay (Billboard)	40
US Alternative Airplay (Billboard)	21
US Pop Airplay (Billboard)	22
US Pop 100 (Billboard)	28

=== Year-end charts ===
Chart (2008)	Position
Australia (ARIA)	82

== Certifications ==
Certifications for "I Don't Care"
Region	Certification	Certified units/sales
Australia (ARIA)	Gold	35,000^{^}
Canada (Music Canada)	Gold	40,000^{*}
New Zealand (RMNZ)	Gold	15,000^{‡}
United Kingdom (BPI)	Gold	400,000^{‡}
United States (RIAA)	2× Platinum	2,000,000^{‡}
^{*} Sales figures based on certification alone.^{^} Shipments figures based on certification alone.^{‡} Sales+streaming figures based on certification alone.

== Official remixes ==
To date only three remixes of the song are considered as official remixes. Those remixes are the "Suave Suarez Remix", "Machine Shop Remix" and the "Tommie Sunshine & Mightyfools Remix". The first is included on a 2-track CD single released in the United Kingdom, the first is also included on the iTunes deluxe edition of Folie à Deux. The second was released on the Japanese bonus track edition of Folie à Deux. The third was released on Tommie Sunshine's profile and was noted by the official Fall Out Boy website.

- Suave Suarez Remix – 3:11
- Machine Shop Remix – 3:02
- Tommie Sunshine & Mightyfools Remix – 5:16
