= What a Catch, Donnie =

2008 single by Fall Out Boy

Single by Fall Out Boy

from the album Folie à Deux
- Released: September 7, 2009
- Recorded: Los Angeles, California
- Genre: Soft rock; soul
- Length: 4:50
- Label: Island
- Songwriters: Pete Wentz; Patrick Stump; Joe Trohman; Andy Hurley
- Producer: Neal Avron

Fall Out Boy singles chronology
"Headfirst Slide into Cooperstown on a Bad Bet" (2009)	"What a Catch, Donnie" (2009)	"Alpha Dog" (2009)

Music video
- "What a Catch, Donnie" on YouTube

"What a Catch, Donnie" is a song recorded by the American rock band Fall Out Boy for their fourth studio album, Folie à Deux (2008). It was released as the fourth and final single from Folie à Deux in September 2009, through Island Records. "What a Catch, Donnie" was written by bassist Pete Wentz as a tribute to vocalist Patrick Stump, capturing the tension between his recurring self-doubt and musical talent.

The track is a sweeping soul ballad, anchored by piano and lush string arrangements, with its title referencing soul singer Donny Hathaway and including nods to his collaborator Roberta Flack. It evolved into both an introspective reflection and a retrospective on Fall Out Boy's career during a period of uncertainty about the band's future. It contains a key guest appearance from Elvis Costello, one of Stump's longtime heroes. Its bridge features an array of cameos from aughts-era emo hitmakers—including Brendon Urie, Travie McCoy, Gabe Saporta, and more—each reprising a Fall Out Boy song.

Its music video dramatizes Stump adrift at sea, ultimately rescuing his bandmates and collaborators from a sinking ship while surrounded by visual callbacks to the band's past. Critical reception was mixed, with reviewers divided over the song's sentimentality. The song charted near the lower regions of the US and Canadian singles charts.

== Background ==
"What a Catch, Donnie" was developed during the recording of Folie à Deux, a period when Fall Out Boy members were navigating diverging priorities and uncertainty about the band's future. Bassist Pete Wentz wrote the lyrics with singer Patrick Stump in mind, aiming to capture his perspective, including the contrast between his extensive musical abilities and his recurring self-doubt. The opening lyrics of the song announce: "I got troubled thoughts and the self-esteem to match." Stump, who was experiencing a personal low point at the time, connected deeply with the lyrics. He observed that it demonstrated Wentz's skill as a writer and allowed him to engage with the song as a personal confessional despite not having authored the lyrics himself.

The title of the song is a reference to Donny Hathaway; his writing partner, Roberta Flack, is mentioned several times throughout the song. As the song developed, Stump came to view it as both a personal reflection and a retrospective on the band's career. He later suggested that several members sensed the band may be reaching its end, which informed the spirit they approached its recording with.

=== Cameo appearances ===
Structurally, the track contrasts introspective themes in its first half with a more celebratory retrospective in its latter portion, incorporating interpolations from earlier Fall Out Boy songs. The effect was inspired by charity singles such as "We Are the World". The final portion of the song, dominated by "na na na" vocalizations, was performed entirely by Stump using multiple tracks. Producer Neal Avron printed out an image of the singers from the famed session that produced "We Are the World", and Stump modeled his inflections after iconic artists including Bob Dylan, Bruce Springsteen, and Cyndi Lauper.

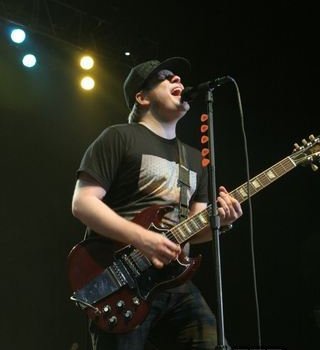
The song was written about Patrick Stump, who steered the song toward his soul instincts.

The song boasts a wide array of cameo appearances from different singers. The inaugural guest spot is saved for singer-songwriter Elvis Costello, who at 3:00 sings a reprise of Fall Out Boy's song "Headfirst Slide into Cooperstown on a Bad Bet". Costello was one of Stump's biggest influences; drummer Andy Hurley noted that "Elvis is Patrick's favorite person on earth as a musician, singer and songwriter." Although Costello had initially planned to travel to record his part, he was suffering from bronchitis at the time and instead recorded his vocals remotely from his personal studio. Though the band sent the track to him on a whim, he reportedly enjoyed the song.

The bridge of the song contains guest vocals from various musicians and singers of the mid-aughts emo scene, most signed to Wentz’s label, Decaydance. Each guest performed motifs from earlier Fall Out Boy songs, creating a layered, ensemble-style effect. Participants in the recording process described the track as carrying the atmosphere of a farewell. The songs and artists are as follow:

- 3:45 "Grand Theft Autumn/Where Is Your Boy" featuring Gabe Saporta (of Cobra Starship and Midtown).
- 3:52 "Sugar, We're Goin Down" featuring Travie McCoy (of Gym Class Heroes).
- 4:00 "Dance, Dance" featuring Brendon Urie (of Panic! at the Disco).
- 4:08 "This Ain't a Scene, It's an Arms Race" featuring Doug Neumann, the general management for Crush Management, which claims Decaydance as part of its roster.
- 4:15 "Thnks fr th Mmrs" featuring Alexander DeLeon (of The Cab).
- 4:22 "Growing Up" featuring William Beckett (of The Academy Is...).

== Release and reception ==
It was first released as part of the buildup to the album on iTunes on October 14, 2008. To promote the song, the band performed the track on Late Night with Jimmy Fallon, as well as on Today.

Music critics gave the song mixed reviews, with many appreciating and deriding its mawkishness in equal measure. Jody Rosen in Rolling Stone called it "glorious", commending its "string-swathed soul balladeering," while David Marchese of Spin found it musically impressive. Stephen Thomas Erlewine, writing for AllMusic, noted a possible Beatles reference in the song’s ensemble outro, likening it to John Lennon's performance on "All You Need Is Love". Allison Stewart from The Washington Post found it self-absorbed, while Ehren Gresehover from Vulture dismissed it as lame. Caroline Sullivan of the Guardian questioned Costello's involvement, deriding the song as uninspired and sentimental. Elsewhere, Entertainment Weekly's Leah Greenblatt joked that the song "perhaps the most fun legally allowed" in a power ballad. Ed Masley, writing for the Arizona Republic, viewed it endearing while also "completely overdone." Many critics compared the song to the work of Elton John.

Chris Payne of Billboard described "What a Catch, Donnie" as a fitting closing statement for the 2000s emo era, analyzing its coterie of cameos in the context of the genre's decreasing relevance as the decade ended.

== Music video ==
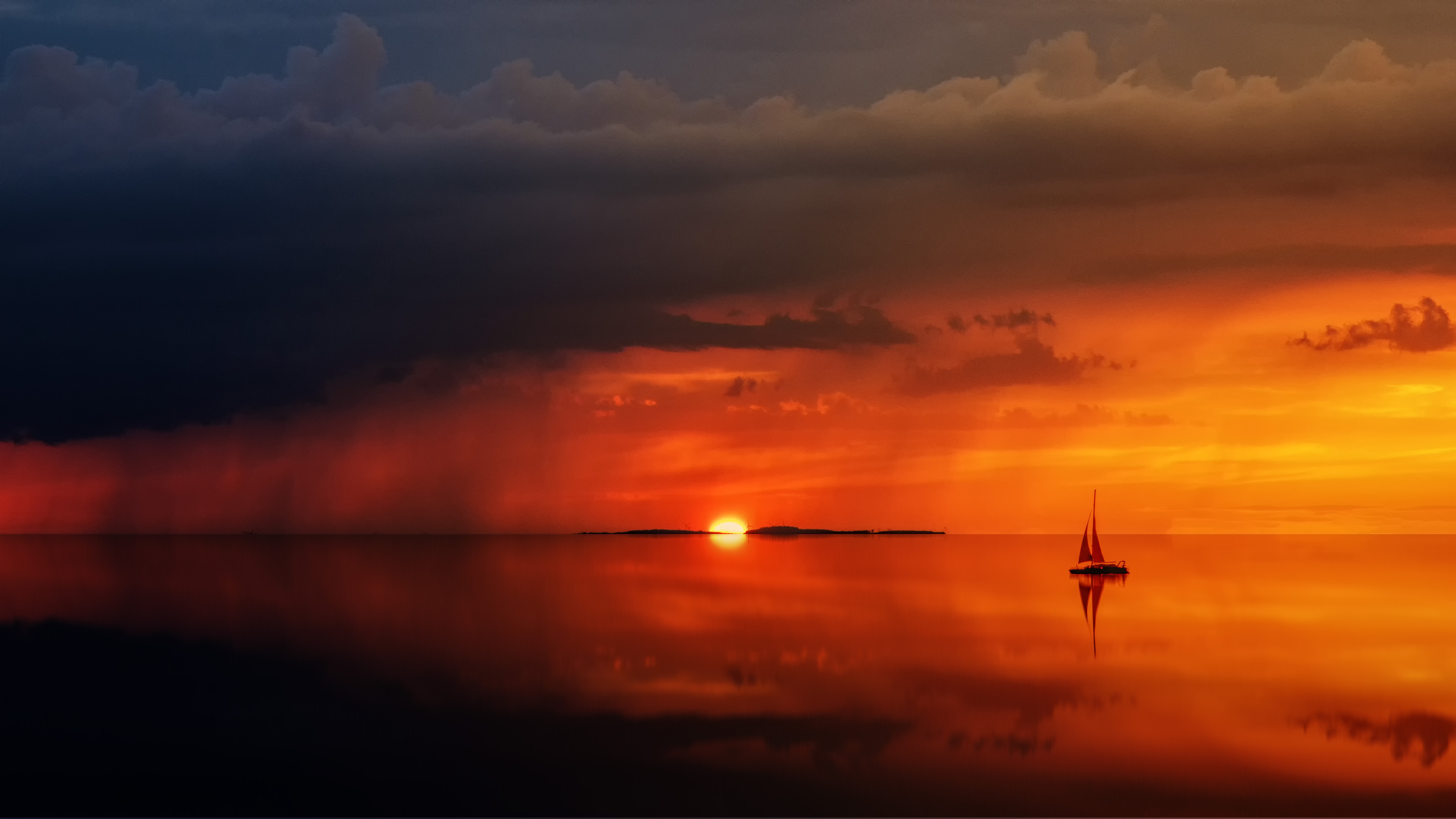
The video depicts the band's future metaphorically, showing a ship sailing toward the sunset.

The music video for the song was directed by Alan Ferguson. Stump took a leading role in the development of the video. The band filmed the video on July 1, 2009, and continued editing it in the following weeks leading up to its release. The video was produced amid heightened fan speculation surrounding the band’s impending breakup. Wentz later stated in a Twitter chat that, if "What a Catch, Donnie" had been Fall Out Boy’s final release, he would have felt satisfied with it as a closing statement.

The music video centers on singer Patrick Stump adrift at sea, depicted in isolation as he passes time fishing, reading, and playing piano aboard a small vessel. His solitude is interrupted when he rescues a seagull caught in rope, forming a brief companionship that alleviates his loneliness. Throughout the video, visual references to the band's earlier work appear as objects recovered from the sea, including props and imagery associated with previous Fall Out Boy videos. Near the conclusion, Stump encounters a sinking ship and rescues its passengers—portrayed by his bandmates and frequent collaborators—who gather aboard his vessel. As they approach shore, Stump releases the seagull, which flies off toward land. The video closes with a montage of the band's past material, accompanied by motifs from earlier songs.

The official music video was released August 7, 2009, through MTV outlets. The initial upload contained a CGI version of Wentz that the band later removed, as they considered the efffect low quality. The band planned a series of comedic viral videos that they released two weeks after the debut of the video, putting more context into its storyline. Wentz said at the time that the video was dedicated to the rapper Dolla, who was killed a few months before the song's release.

== Chart performance ==
Chart (2008)	Peak position
Canada (Canadian Hot 100)	95
US Billboard Hot 100	94
