= Demographic marketer =

Demographic marketers use demographics in marketing research, and the assessment of the changing trends of consumer behavior. Demographics can be called a science, and demographic marketers can be called scientists. A demographic is used to describe individuals who are from a particular area. It can also be used to describe individuals who would rely on purchasing a particular product or service. Using demographics, a marketing manager can try to grasp what certain people think and what they are willing to buy.

By understanding how various characteristics of the population reflect their tastes, demographic marketers get an idea of the probability of the sales returns of a launched product in a given area. For any type of business, knowing who the customers are most likely to be through demographic analysis will make it easier to market effectively.
