= Leslie Perlow =

American ethnographer

Leslie A. Perlow is an American ethnographer currently the Konosuke Matsushita Professor of Leadership at Harvard Business School.
