= List of venues in the United Kingdom =

There are many venues in the United Kingdom where a variety of national and international sport, musical and entertainment acts perform.

== Stadiums and festivals ==
Stadium	City	Capacity	Notes	Refs
American Express Stadium	Brighton and Hove	32,176		
Anfield	Liverpool	61,276		
AESSEAL New York Stadium	Rotherham	12,021		
Bramall Lane	Sheffield	32,050		
Buxton Blues Festival	Aldwark	500		
Bloodstock Open Air	Catton Hall, Derby	20,000		
Celtic Park	Glasgow	64,411		
Etihad Stadium	Greater Manchester	60,000		
Clapham Common	London	20,000		
JobServe Community Stadium	Colchester	17,000		
Coventry Building Society Arena	Coventry	32,753 (seated)		
Craven Park	Kingston upon Hull	12,225–20,000		
Creamfields	Daresbury	70,000		
Download Festival	Donington Park	110,000		
Easter Road	Edinburgh	20,421		
Eco-Power Stadium	Doncaster	15,231		
Elland Road	Leeds	37,792		
Emirates Old Trafford	Greater Manchester	50,000		
Emirates Stadium	London	60,704		
Ewood Park	Blackburn	31,367		
Finsbury Park	London	40,000		
Falkirk Stadium	Falkirk	25,000		
Glasgow Summer Sessions	Glasgow	35,000		
Glastonbury Festival	Near Pilton	210,000		
Gloworm Festival	Thoresby Park	20,000		
Goodison Park	Liverpool	39,572		
Hampden Park	Glasgow	51,866		
Highest Point Festival	Williamson Park	35,000		
Hill Dickinson Stadium	Liverpool	52,769		
Hillsborough Stadium	Sheffield	34,835		
Hyde Park	London	150,000 (1996), approximately		
Ibrox Stadium	Glasgow	51,700 (seated)		
In the Park, Sefton Park	Liverpool	40,000		
Kelburn Garden Party, Fairlie		4,000		
King Power Stadium	Leicester	32,259		
London Stadium	London	80,000	Formerly Olympic Stadium	
Meadow Lane	Nottingham	19,841		
MKM Stadium	Kingston upon Hull	25,400		
Molineux Stadium	Wolverhampton	30,000 (incl. boxes can equal 31,700)		
Murrayfield Stadium	Edinburgh	67,144 (seated)		
Nass Festival	Shepton Mallet	15,000		
National Bowl	Milton Keynes	65,000 (Standing)		
Oakwell Stadium	Barnsley	23,287		
Old Trafford	Greater Manchester	74,879		
One Call Stadium	Mansfield	10,022		
Pittodrie Stadium	Aberdeen	20,866		
Pride Park Stadium	Derby	33,597		
Principality Stadium	Cardiff	78,000		
Reading and Leeds Festival		80,000		
Riverside Festival Glasgow	Glasgow	10,000		
Roundhay Park	Leeds	79,999		
Shambala Festival	Kelmarsh	25,000		
Sincil Bank	Lincoln	10,669		
SMH Group Stadium	Chesterfield	10,292		
Stadium of Light	Sunderland	60,000		
Stadium MK	Milton Keynes	30,500		
STōK Racecourse	Wrexham	13,341		
Swansea.com Stadium	Swansea	21,088		
Terminal V	Edinburgh	20,000		
Tottenham Hotspur Stadium	London	62,000		
Tramlines Festival	Sheffield	50,000		
TRNSMT	Glasgow Green, Glasgow	50,000		
Truck Festival	Steventon	30,000		
Twickenham Stadium	London	82,000		
Tynecastle Park	Edinburgh	20,099		
Wembley Stadium	London	90,000	New; 2007–present	
Wembley Stadium	London	82,000 (seated)	Old; 1923–2000	
Y Not Festival	Pikehall	30,000		
Villa Park	Birmingham	42,682		

== Indoor arenas ==
Name	Location	Capacity	Notes	Refs
bp pulse LIVE	Birmingham	13,928 to 15,643		
Utilita Arena Cardiff	Cardiff	7,500 (standing); 5,000 (seated)		
Co-op Live	Manchester	23,500		
Copper Box Arena	London	7,500		
Drumsheds	London	15,000		
Earls Court Exhibition Centre	London	20,000	Open 1887–2014	
Earls Court Two	London	10,750	Open 1991–2014	
First Direct Bank Arena	Leeds	13,500		
Lee Valley VeloPark	London	7,000		
M&S Bank Arena	Liverpool	11,000; 4,000 (ECHO 2); (1,350) auditorium		
London Arena	London	12,500	Open 1989–2006	
AO Arena	Manchester	21,000		
Motorpoint Arena Nottingham	Nottingham	10,000		
The O2 Arena	London	20,000		
The O2 Belfast	Belfast	11,058		
OVO Arena Wembley	London	12,500		
OVO Hydro	Glasgow	13,000		
P&J Live	Aberdeen	16,000		
SEC Centre	Glasgow	12,500		
Utilita Arena Birmingham	Birmingham	16,000		
Utilita Arena Newcastle	Newcastle	11,000		
Utilita Arena Sheffield	Sheffield	13,500		

== Exhibition and conference venues ==
Name	Location	Capacity	Notes	Refs
EventCity	Manchester	9,360 (Hall 3); 4,500 (Hall 4)	Open 2011–2021	
Exhibition Centre Liverpool	Liverpool	7,000 (standing, combined halls); 2,400 (per hall)		
ExCeL London	London	5,000 (ICC Auditorium), 65,000 (event halls)		
Farnborough International Exhibition & Conference Centre	Farnborough	12,000 (Hall 1); 3,150 (Hall 5)		
The Grand Hall, Olympia London	London	7,000 (standing), 4,000 (seated)		
Great Hall, Alexandra Palace	London	10,250 (standing), 7,250 (seated)		
Harrogate Convention Centre	Harrogate	2,000 (Auditorium); 1,600 (Exhibition Halls); 600 (Queens Suite); 1,000 (Royal Hall)		
ICC Wales	Newport	1,500 (Tiered auditorium)		
Manchester Central Convention Complex	Manchester	10,900 (Halls 1 and 2 combined), 8,100 (Hall 2)		
National Exhibition Centre	Birmingham	12,000 (Hall 4), 8,000 (Hall 5)		

== Indoor theatres and halls ==
Name	Location	Capacity	Notes	Refs
Alban Arena	St Albans	1,200 standing; 850 seated		
Albert Hall, Manchester	Manchester	2,000		
Barbican Centre	London	1,949 (Hall); 200 (Pit)		
Barrowland Ballroom	Glasgow	1,900		
Bath Pavilion	Bath	1,400		
The Baths Hall	Scunthorpe	1,800 standing; 1,021 seated		
Birmingham Digbeth Secretspace	Birmingham	3,000 standing; 1,300 seated		
Blackpool Winter Gardens	Blackpool	3,500		
Bournemouth International Centre	Bournemouth	6,500 standing; 4,000 seated		
Bradford Live	Bradford	4,000 standing; 3,400 seating		
Brentwood Centre		2,000		
The Bridgewater Hall	Manchester	2,371		
Bridlington Spa	Bridlington	3,800		
Brighton Centre	Brighton	4,500		
Brighton Dome	Brighton	1,860 standing; 1,700 seated		
Bristol Beacon	Bristol	2,124 standing, 1,866 seated		
Bristol Hippodrome	Bristol	1,951		
British Airways ARC	London	3,800		
Caird Hall	Dundee	2,300 standing; 1,200 seated		
Cambridge Corn Exchange		1,849		
Cambridge Theatre	London	1,231		
Cardiff University Students' Union Great Hall	Cardiff	1,600		
Citadel Arts Centre	St Helens	1,000		
City Hall	Salisbury	1,255 standing; 1,355 mixed; 953 seated		
Cliffs Pavilion	Southend-on-sea	1,630		
Connexin Live Arena	Kingston upon Hull	3,500		
Crucible Theatre, Sheffield	Sheffield	980		
De La Warr Pavilion	Bexhill	1,500		
De Montfort Hall	Leicester	2,200		
Edinburgh Corn Exchange	Edinburgh	3,000 (concerts); 1,000 (dinners)		
Edinburgh Festival Theatre	Edinburgh	1,915 seated		
Edinburgh Playhouse	Edinburgh	3,059		
Electric Ballroom	London	1,100 (800 downstairs, 300 upstairs)		
Electric Bristol	Bristol	1,100	Formerly know as: SWX, Syndicate, The Works, Odyssey, Papillions, Romeo and Juliet's and Top Rank Suite Top Rank Suite - Wikipedia||	
Electric Brixton	London	1,500	Formerly known as the Fridge	
Electric Studios	Sheffield	1,050 standing		
Embassy Theatre	Skegness	1,168		
Empress Ballroom	Blackpool	3,000		
The Engine Shed	Lincoln	1,600		
Eventim Apollo	London	5,039 standing; 3,632 seated	Formerly known as the Hammersmith Odeon	
Eventim Olympia	Liverpool	1,960		
Floral Pavilion Theatre		814		
The Forum	Hertfordshire	2,250		
The Forum, Bath	Bath	1,640		
Forum Birmingham	Birmingham	3,500		
G Live	Guilford	1,700		
Glasgow Royal Concert Hall	Glasgow	2,500		
The Glasshouse International Centre for Music	Newcastle Gateshead	1,700 (Sage One); 450 (Sage Two)		
Grand Central Hall	Liverpool	1,150		
The Grand Theatre	Blackpool	1,100		
Great Hall	Exeter	1,500 standing; 650 seated		
The Halls Wolverhampton	Wolverhampton	3,404 (Civic Hall); 1,289 (Wulfrun Hall); 550 (Slade Rooms)		
The Harold Pinter Theatre	London	796		
Heaven	London	1,725		
HERE at Outernet	London	1,600		
The Hexagon	Reading	1,200		
Hull Arena	Kingston upon Hull	3,750		
Hull City Hall	Kingston upon Hull	1,800 standing; 1,200 seated		
Indigo at The O2	London	2,750		
Kilburn National Club	London			
King George's Hall	Blackburn	3,500		
King's Theatre, Edinburgh	Edinburgh	1,350 seated		
Koko	London	1,500	Formerly known as Camden Palace and The Music Machine	
Leith Theatre	Edinburgh	1,500		
The Liquid Room	Edinburgh	800 (club nights); 650-700 (gigs)		
Liverpool Empire Theatre	Liverpool	2,348		
London Coliseum	London	2,358		
London Hippodrome	London	1,340 seated		
London Palladium	London	2,300		
Lyceum Theatre	London	2,096		
Lyceum Theatre	Sheffield	1,068		
Manchester Academy	Manchester	2,575 (Academy 1); 900 (Academy 2); 620 (Club Academy); 450 (Academy 3)		
Marble Factory	Bristol	1,600		
Mayflower Theatre	Southampton	2,270		
Mountford Hall	Liverpool	2,300		
Music Hall, Aberdeen	Aberdeen	1,281 seated		
The Venue	London	2,000		
New Theatre Oxford	Oxford	1,785		
New Victoria Theatre	Woking	1,300		
Newport Leisure Centre	Newport	2,000		
NX Newcastle	Newcastle	2,135		
O2 Academy Birmingham	Birmingham	3,009 (Academy); 600 (Academy 2); 250 (Academy 3)		
O2 Academy Bournemouth	Bournemouth	1,800		
O2 Academy Bristol	Bristol	1,650		
O2 Academy Glasgow	Glasgow	2,500		
O2 Academy Leeds	Leeds	2,300		
O2 Academy Leicester	Leicester	1,450		
O2 Academy Liverpool	Liverpool	1,750; 1250 (Academy 1); 500 (Academy 2)		
O2 Apollo Manchester	Manchester	3,500		
O2 Academy Oxford	Oxford	1,020		
O2 Academy Sheffield	Sheffield	2,150		
O2 Brixton Academy	London	4,921		
O2 City Hall Newcastle	Newcastle	2,135		
O2 Forum Kentish Town	London	2,300		
O2 Guildhall Southampton	Southampton	1,749		
O2 Institute	Birmingham	1,500 (O2 Institute 1); 600 (O2 Institute 2); 250 (O2 Institute 3)		
O2 Institute Birmingham	Birmingham	2,000		
The O2 Ritz	Manchester	1,500		
O2 Shepherd's Bush Empire	London	2,000		
O2 Victoria Warehouse	Manchester	3,500		
The Old Fruitmarket	Glasgow	2,000		
Old Vic	London	1,067		
OPEN Norwich	Norwich	1,450 standing; 500 seated	Closed 2020	
Perth Concert Hall	Perth	1,600 standing; 1,200 seated		
Planet Ice Coventry - SkyDome Arena	Coventry	3,000		
Planet Ice Leeds Arena	Leeds	2,200		
Planet Ice Milton Keynes Arena	Milton Keynes	2,500		
Plymouth Pavilions	Plymouth	4,000		
Portsmouth Guildhall	Portsmouth	2,500		
Portsmouth Pyramids Centre	Portsmouth	1,200 standing; 500 seated		
Queen's Hall, Edinburgh	Edinburgh	900 standing; 801 seated		
Rainbow Theatre	London		1971–1982; now a Christian church	
Regent Theatre	Stoke-on-Trent	1,600		
Regent Theatre, Ipswich	Ipswich	1,500		
Rialto Reborn	Coventry	1,200 standing; 550 seated		
Rock City	Nottingham	2,450		
Roundhouse	London	3,300 standing; 1,700 seated		
Royal Albert Hall	London	5,544		
Royal Concert Hall	Nottingham	2,499		
Royal Festival Hall	London	2,895		
Royal Lyceum Theatre	Edinburgh	658		
Royal National Theatre	London	1,160 (Olivier); 890 (Lyttelton); 400 (Cottesloe)		
Royal Opera House	London	2,268		
Royal Shakespeare Theatre	Stratford-upon-Avon	1,000		
Sadler's Wells Theatre	London	1,560		
Scala	London	1,145		
Shaftesbury Theatre	London	1,416		
Shakespeare's Globe Theatre	London	1,570		
City Hall	Sheffield	2,271		
Sondheim Theatre	London	1,137		
Southampton Engine Rooms	Southampton	860		
The Spotlight, Hoddesdon		1,360 standing; 566 seated		
St Augustine's Cultural Arts	Brighton	1,500 standing; 1,000 seated		
St George's Hall, Bradford	Bradford	1,335 Short Stage Format		
Sunderland Empire	Sunderland	2,200		
Swansea Arena	Swansea	3,500		
Symphony Hall, Birmingham	Birmingham	2,262		
The Telegraph Building	Belfast	1,200		
Theatre Royal, Drury Lane	London			
Theatre Royal, Norwich	Norwich	1,300		
Theatre Royal	Nottingham	1,107		
Tobacco Dock	London	2,000		
Tom Stoppard Theatre	London	640		
Tramshed, Cardiff	Cardiff	1,000		
Troxy	London	3,100		
UEA LCR	Norwich	1,550		
Usher Hall	Edinburgh	2,900 standing; 2,200 seated		
Venue Cymru	Llandudno	2,500 (Arena); 1,450 (Theatre Auditorium)		
Victoria Hall	Stoke-on-Trent	1,467		
Victoria Theatre	Halifax	1,512		
Warwick Arts Centre	Coventry	1,535 (Butterworth Hall), 573 (Theatre), 150 (Studio), 143 (Helen Martin Studio), 250 (Woods Scawen Room)		
Watford Colosseum	Watford	2,000		
Weymouth Pavilion	Weymouth	988		
Winter Gardens, Margate	Margate	1,900		
York Barbican	York	1,900 standing; 1,500 seated		

== Smaller venues ==
(including public houses)

Name	Location	Capacity	Notes	Refs
The 1 in 12 Club	Bradford			
100 Club	London	350		
606 Club	London	120		
Albert Hall, Nottingham	Nottingham	750		
An Seòmar	Inverness	450		
The Aquarium	Lowestoft	900		
Band on the Wall	Manchester	520		
Bawtry Phoenix Theatre	Bawtry	72		
Bloomsbury Theatre	Bloomsbury	London – 535		
The Boileroom	Guildford	300		
The Bongo Club	Edinburgh	300 standing		
The Borderline	London	275		
Britannia Adelphi Hotel	Liverpool	500 seated		
Brudenell Social Club	Leeds	400		
Buskers	Dundee	450		
Cabaret Voltaire	Edinburgh	150 standing, 60 seated (The Boudoir); 200 standing, 80 seated (The Vault)		
Cambridge Junction		850		
Camden Falcon	London		Closed circa 1990s	
Camden Underworld	Camden Town, London	500		
The Caves Edinburgh	Edinburgh	650		
Cellar	Aberdeen	80		
Century Theatre	Coalville, Leicestershire	206		
Cheltenham Town Hall	Cheltenham	978		
Churchill Theatre	Bromley	781		
Concorde 2	Brighton	600		
Corn Exchange, Exeter	Exeter	500 standing, 300 seated		
Corn Exchange, Ipswich	Ipswich	900 standing, 800 seated		
DIY Space For London	Bermondsey	160		
The Dome, London	London	600		
Downstairs at the Dome	London	300		
Drummomds	Aberdeen	300 standing		
Dublin Castle, Camden	London	150		
Eel Pie Club, Twickenham	London	200+		
Electric Circus	Edinburgh	300		
Epic Studios	Norwich	900		
Everyman Theatre	Cheltenham	675		
The Fox and Firkin	London	499		
Fulham Greyhound	London	275	Circa 1971–1990	
The Garage, London	London	600		
Greencoat Place	Victoria	100		
The Half Moon	Putney, London	200		
hmv Empire	Coventry	800 standing (Empire 1) – 180 standing (Empire 2)		
Hope and Anchor	Islington, London			
The Horn	St Albans	200		
House of Detention	Clerkenwell, London	130		
Jazz Cafe	London	350		
The Leeds Club	Leeds	150		
Lemon Tree	Aberdeen	550 standing, various seated caps		
Lemongrove	Exeter	700		
Lighthouse	Poole	669		
Limelight	Belfast	750		
The Lion Theatre	Horncastle	96		
The Magic Garden	London	380		
Malvern Theatres	Worcestershire	850		
Marquee Club	London		Wardour Street 1964–1988; Charing Cross Road 1988–2001	
The Mart Theatre	Skipton	300		
MK11 Live Music Venue	Milton Keynes	330		
Music Room Space Events	Mayfair, London			
The New Adelphi Club	Hull	200		
The New Headingley Club	Leeds	100		
New Theatre Royal Lincoln	Lincoln	475		
New Vic Theatre	Stoke-on-Trent	600		
O2 Academy Islington	Islington, London	800		
Off The Square	Manchester	200+		
The Old Market	Brighton & Hove	500		
Orchard Theatre	Dartford	950		
Perth Theatre		500		
Phoenix	Exeter	300 standing; 158 seated		
The Picturedrome	Holmfirth	690		
The Picturedrome	Northampton	300		
Playhouse Theatre	Oxford	663		
Powerhaus	Islington, London		Was once The Pied Bull; closed circa 1990s; now Halifax Building Society	
Princess Royal Theatre	Port Talbot	798		
Purcell Room	South Bank, London	367		
Queen Elizabeth Hall	London	913		
Ronnie Scott's	London	300		
The Rose Theatre	Chesterfield	160		
The Roxy	London		1976–1978; now a sports shop	
Ruskin Arms	London	499	Circa 1960s–2008	
Scala	Kings Cross, London	800		
Sheffield Library Theatre	Sheffield	260		
Silsden Town Hall	Bradford	180		
The Sir George Robey	Finsbury Park		Closed circa 2000s; Briefly renamed Powerhaus after Islington venue "moved" here	
Sneaky Pete’s	Edinburgh	100		
@sohoplace	London	600		
The Square	Harlow	200	Closed January 2017	
The Stables	Milton Keynes	398 seated, 50 standing (Jim Marshall Auditorium); 80 seated, 100 standing (Stage 2)		
The Standard Music Venue	Walthamstow	300		
Stephan Joseph Theatre	Scarborough	569		
STYX	North London	499		
Theatre Royal, Brighton	Brighton	952		
Tunnels	Aberdeen	300 standing, 500 clubnight		
Under The Bridge	Fulham, London	550		
Union Chapel	Islington, London	750		
Vibez	Newport	750		
Victoria Hall	Stoke-on-Trent	644		
The Victoria Wood Theatre	Bowness-on-Windermere	257		
Vintage Rockbar	Doncaster	150		
The Voodoo Rooms	Edinburgh	200 standing		
Vortex Jazz Club	London	100		
Yoko Ono Lennon Centre	Liverpool	600 (lecture theatre), 400 (Tung auditorium)		
Yvonne Arnaud Theatre	Guildford	586		

== See also ==
- List of London venues
