= Live Nation UK =

United Kingdom subsidiary of Live Nation Entertainment

- Type: Subsidiary of Live Nation Entertainment
- Industry: Promoter
- Founded: 2005; 21 years ago
- Headquarters: London, England
- Website: www.livenation.co.uk

Live Nation UK is the United Kingdom subsidiary of Live Nation Entertainment. They are best known for promoting concerts, operating venues and running festivals.

As Clear Channel UK, Live Nation UK acquired the Mean Fiddler organisation and owns 51% of Academy Music Group, giving it a stake in most major music festivals and medium-sized London music venues. It has since merged with ticket sales and distribution company, Ticketmaster to become Live Nation Entertainment.

== Current properties ==
Promoters:

- Live Nation UK
- Metropolis Music
- DF Concerts
- Academy Music Group (51%)
- Cuffe & Taylor

Venues operated:

- Arts Club Liverpool (Academy Music Group)
- FlyDSA Arena, Sheffield
- Liverpool Guild of Students (Academy Music Group)
- Motorpoint Arena, Cardiff
- O2 ABC Glasgow (Academy Music Group)
- O2 Academy Birmingham (Academy Music Group)
- O2 Academy Bournemouth (Academy Music Group)
- O2 Academy Bristol (Academy Music Group)
- O2 Academy Brixton (Academy Music Group)
- O2 Academy Glasgow (Academy Music Group)
- O2 Academy Islington (Academy Music Group)
- O2 Academy Leeds (Academy Music Group)
- O2 Academy Leicester (Academy Music Group)
- O2 Academy Liverpool (Academy Music Group)
- O2 Academy Newcastle (Academy Music Group)
- O2 Academy Oxford (Academy Music Group)
- O2 Academy Sheffield (Academy Music Group)
- O2 Apollo Manchester
- O2 City Hall Newcastle (Academy Music Group)
- O2 Forum Kentish Town (Academy Music Group)
- O2 Institute Birmingham (Academy Music Group)
- O2 Ritz Manchester (Academy Music Group)
- O2 Shepherd's Bush Empire (Academy Music Group)
- O2 Southampton Guildhall
- Victoria Warehouse, Manchester (Academy Music Group)
- The Old Fire Station Bournemouth (Academy Music Group)

Festivals promoted:

- BluesFest (as Festival Republic)
- Community Festival (as Festival Republic)
- Creamfields
- Download Festival
- Latitude Festival (as Festival Republic)
- Leeds Festival (as Festival Republic)
- Reading Festival (as Festival Republic)
- Wireless Festival (as Festival Republic)
- Wilderness Festival (as Festival Republic)
- Boomtown (stake held since 2022 through LNGSJM Holdco and, since 2025, UK Festival Holdings; see Boomtown article)

== Former properties ==
Former venues operated:

- Alexandra Theatre, Birmingham
- Apollo Victoria Theatre, London
- Bristol Hippodrome
- Dominion Theatre, London
- Edinburgh Playhouse
- Grimsby Auditorium
- Liverpool Empire Theatre
- Lyceum Theatre, London
- New Theatre, Oxford
- Palace Theatre, Manchester
- Sunderland Empire Theatre
- Wembley Arena
- West End Theatre, London
