= O2 Academy =

The O2 Academy may refer to one of a number of Academy Music Group venues in the United Kingdom (in alphabetical order):

- O2 Academy Birmingham
- O2 Academy Bournemouth
- O2 Academy Bristol
- O2 Academy Brixton
- O2 Academy Edinburgh
- O2 Academy Glasgow
- O2 Academy Islington
- O2 Academy Leeds
- O2 Academy Leicester
- O2 Academy Liverpool
- O2 Academy Newcastle
- O2 Academy Oxford
- O2 Academy Sheffield
