= Academy 2 =

Academy 2 may refer to one of the following music venues in the United Kingdom:

- Manchester Academy 2
- O2 Academy2 Birmingham
- O2 Academy2 Islington
- O2 Academy2 Leicester
- O2 Academy2 Liverpool
- O2 Academy2 Newcastle
- O2 Academy2 Oxford
- O2 Academy2 Sheffield

== See also ==
- O2 Institute2 in Birmingham, United Kingdom
