= Milburn (band) =

English indie rock band

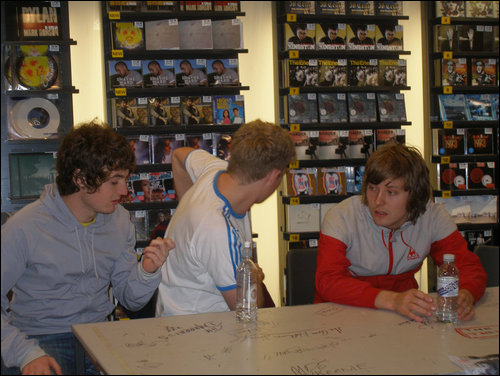
- Joe Carnall, Louis Carnall and Tom Rowley (Joe Green not pictured)

Background information
- Origin: Sheffield, England
- Genres: Indie rock
- Years active: 2001–2008; 2016–present
- Labels: Free Construction; Mercury; VAM; Warners
- Members: Joe Carnall; Louis Carnall; Tom Rowley; Joe Green
- Website: www.milburnmusic.co.uk

Milburn are an indie rock band from Sheffield, England, that consisted of Joe Carnall, Louis Carnall, Tom Rowley, and Joe Green. They announced their split on 28 March 2008, with the band playing one final gig at Sheffield's Carling Academy on 24 May 2008 before reuniting in 2016.

== History ==
=== Formation ===
Milburn's formation came after years of friendship through playing football together. Joe Green started playing the drums and Tom and Louis Carnall both learned to play guitar. The three then decided to form a band, in which they would play cover versions of songs by bands they admired. However the band required a singer and bass player, so they encouraged Louis Carnall's younger brother Joe Carnall to join, despite him not knowing how to sing or play bass.

Milburn started out playing small gigs in front of friends, practising at drummer Joe Green's grandma's house. The origin of their name comes from a bet with a friend whose surname was Milburn.

=== Emergence and debut album (2001–2006) ===
The band released their first demo in 2001, titled "Steel Town". The demo was handed out at gigs and to anyone interested in listening. The demo's artwork was simply the band's name in front of the colours blue and white, representing their love for local football team Sheffield Wednesday. The demo contained three tracks, "Steel Town", "High & Dry" and "Tommy".

In 2002 Milburn sold out the Boardwalk in Sheffield twice and played at The Cavern Club in Liverpool, The Garage in London and The Leadmill in Sheffield, while supporting Tony Wright's band Laika Dog and Cosmic Rough Riders.

After releasing two limited singles, "Lipstick Lickin" and "Showroom", on their own label Free Construction, Milburn signed to Mercury Records in 2006. Their debut single for the label, "Send in the Boys", reached number 22 in the UK Singles Chart in April 2006, and their debut album, Well Well Well, released on 9 October 2006 on Mercury Records reached number 32 in the UK Albums Chart.

=== These Are the Facts (2007–2008) ===
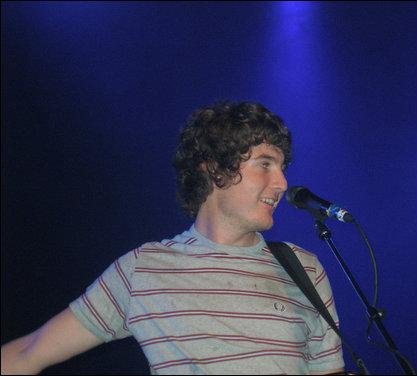
Joe Carnall

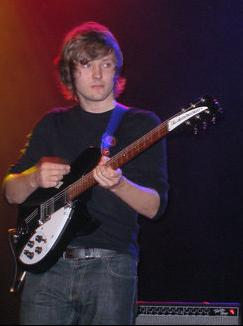
Tom Rowley

Milburn released their second album These Are the Facts on 24 September 2007, preceded by the first single from the album "What Will You Do (When the Money Goes)?" on 17 September.

Milburn promoted These Are the Facts with an initial UK tour in September 2007 then another tour in November 2007.

As part of the November 2007 tour, the gig at Manchester Metropolitan University's K2 was cancelled halfway through after the venue failed to hire a sufficient crowd barrier. This resulted in uncontrollable surges by the crowd, which culminated in an alleged attack on a fan by an event security attendant who then turned on Louis Carnall.

=== Break-up (2008–2016) ===
Milburn announced on 28 March 2008 that, after much consideration, they had decided it was time to call it a day. They said there had been no falling out in the band and they still remained friends and supporters of each other as they explore new musical horizons.

The band played two final gigs, at the ABC Glasgow on 22 May and the Carling Academy Sheffield on 24 May 2008, as well as releasing two outtakes from These Are the Facts, "The District Line" and "Stay at Home".

=== Reunion shows and third album (2016–present) ===
The band reunited in April 2016 for four shows at the O2 Academy Sheffield to celebrate ten years since the release of Well Well Well. The success of the shows led to the band announcing an Autumn UK tour, as well as a new single. The "Midnight Control / Forming of a Fate" double A-side was released in September 2016. The single was recorded at Parr St. Studios, Liverpool, under producer Bill Ryder-Jones. The band continued to work with Ryder-Jones, completing an album on 26 January 2017.

The band released their third album Time on 29 September 2017 via the band's own label "count to 10 Records" and PledgeMusic. The album which was recorded in Liverpool with Bill Ryder Jones.

== Side-projects ==
After the split, Louis Carnall became a member of Lords of Flatbush with ex-Arctic Monkeys bassist Andy Nicholson and Sheffield based singer Steve Edwards; however, he is no longer a member.

Tom Rowley and Joe Green became members of The Backhanded Compliments and remain in the band's current incarnation Dead Sons. In January 2009 Tom Rowley joined Reverend and the Makers, replacing Tom Jarvis on guitar but subsequently left to concentrate on Dead Sons. In 2013 he also joined Arctic Monkeys as a touring member.

In 2009, Joe Carnall started his own band with ex-Arctic Monkeys bassist Andy Nicholson initially called Joe Carnall and the Book Club (subsequently renamed simply The Book Club) and in January 2012 he also joined Reverend and the Makers. In addition, he also performs as Joe Carnall & Friends in which he and a revolving group of friends from bands such as The Book Club, Milburn and Reverend and the Makers play mostly acoustic versions of songs by both The Book Club and Milburn as well as performing covers of other well known songs. The Joe Carnall & Friends shows sell out weeks in advance and the Christmas 2013 show sold out the original venue in just 28 minutes and had to be upgraded to The Leadmill to cope with demand.

In 2019, Joe Carnall released his first solo album under the name Good Cop Bad Cop; the self titled debut was produced by Arctic Monkeys drummer Matt Helders.

== Discography ==
=== Albums ===
- Well Well Well (2006, Mercury)
- These Are the Facts (2007, Mercury)
- Time (2017, VAM Records)

=== EPs ===
- Steel Town (2001)
- On Top of the World (2002)
- Along Comes Mary (2003)
- Milburn (May 2005; re-released October 2005, Free Construction)
- Send in the Boys (2006, Mercury; Japan only)

=== Singles ===
- "Send in the Boys" (2006, Mercury)
- "Cheshire Cat Smile" (2006, Mercury)
- "What You Could've Won" (2006, Mercury)
- "What Will You Do (When the Money Goes)?" (2007, Mercury)
- "Midnight Control"/"Forming of a Fate" (2016, VAM/Warner)
