= Tramlines Festival =

Annual music festival held in Sheffield, England

Coordinates: 53.4080°N 1.5014°W

- Genre: Rock, indie, pop, electronic, dance, hip hop, folk, experimental, metal, world, reggae
- Dates: End of July
- Locations: Hillsborough Park, Sheffield
- Years active: Annually since 2009
- Capacity: 50,000
- Website: www.tramlines.org.uk

The Tramlines Festival is an annual music festival held in Sheffield, South Yorkshire. The festival was originally free to attend, but now requires tickets. The line-up consists of national and local artists. The festival was curated and organised by a panel comprising local venue owners, promoters and volunteers. The name of the festival is inspired by the city's tram network. (Note: The present location of the festival, Hillsborough Park, is served by Hillsborough Interchange tram stop, with extra services provided during event weekends.) Tramlines held its first festival in 2009, which attracted 35,000 fans and was seen as a huge success, and 2010's event doubled that figure. The success of Tramlines Festival 2011 led to the event winning 'Best Metropolitan Festival' at the UK Festival Awards. Superstruct Entertainment, the live entertainment platform backed by Providence Equity Partners, owns the festival after it entered definitive agreement for the acquisition of several live music and entertainment festivals from Global Media & Entertainment and Broadwick Live.

== Venues ==
The festival took place at over 70 venues and four main stages in the city centre, including Devonshire Green, The Leadmill, The Viper Rooms, The Fat Cat, O2 Academy Sheffield, Barkers Pool, The University of Sheffield, The Harley, The Bowery, the Peace Gardens, Yellow Arch and the main stage at Ponderosa Park with a capacity of 8,000 until 2017. In January 2018 it was announced that the festival would be moving out of the city centre to a new venue in Hillsborough Park, Sheffield, and would consist of four stages including a main stage. The new venue would allow the capacity at the main stage to be around 40,000, with the capacity reduced to 30,000 for the 2019 event.

== Festivals ==
=== 2009 ===
Tramlines held its first festival in 2009. Notable artists such as Rolo Tomassi, Just Jack, Toddla T, Pixie Lott, Little Boots, Example, The Eighties Matchbox B-Line Disaster, The XX and Reverend and The Makers, who headlined, played at the festival. The festival was a huge success, attracting 35,000 fans. The organizers, as well as councillors and Sheffielders, praised the festival. The festivals popularity, along with positive reviews, led to the 2010 event being announced. The festival-goers had to queue to get wristbands, which gave them access to the different stages.

2009's festival recycled 400 litres of paper, 2080 litres of plastic and 560 litres of aluminium in the outdoor venues alone. This led to an environmental campaign in 2010 in which the festival seeks to reduce its environmental impact.

=== 2010 ===
Tramlines Festival 2010 was held from 23 to 25 July. 250 artists performed, and several venues were added, including Sheffield University's Octagon Centre, Tudor Square, The Leadmill, O2 Academy Sheffield, Winter Gardens and the main stage at Devonshire Green increased in capacity from 5,000 to 8,000. Headliners were Echo and the Bunnymen, Mystery Jets, Simian Mobile Disco DJ set, Professor Green, Tinchy Stryder, Future of the Left, Darwin Deez, Macka B, The King Blues, The Hoosiers, Craig David, Dum Dum Girls, Annie Mac and Toddla T.

The festival remained free, and the wristband system was scrapped, replaced with a first-come-first-served turnstile system. The festival attracted 65,000 people. New events at the 2010 festival included a Youth Music Festival, Blues trail and a Ceilidh.

The festival also focused on reducing its environmental impact in 2010. This pledge included a solar powered headphone disco on Devonshire Green, major recycling areas at all of the outdoor stages, and cheap accommodation via Unite.

=== 2011 ===
Tramlines 2011 took place from 22 to 24 July, with an estimated 175,000 revellers in attendance. Over 70 venues took part, with four main stages and at least 200 live acts. Headliners and other notable acts included Ash, Olly Murs, Pixie Lott, The Futureheads, Heaven 17, Dananananaykroyd, David Rodigan, Dry The River, Michael Prophet, Frankie & The Heartstrings, Los Campesinos!, Rolo Tomassi, Dead Sons, Skint & Demoralised, The Crookes and Toddla T. New additions were made to the festival, including 'The Folk Forest', a folk music event taking place in Endcliffe Park, 1.5 miles from the city centre.

=== 2012 ===
Tramlines 2012 took place on Friday 20 July to Sunday 22 July. Headliners included Reverend & The Makers, Roots Manuva and We Are Scientists, with Spector, Ms Dynamite, Mr Scruff, Julio Bashmore, Toddla T, Koreless, Ifan Daffyd, Clock Opera and Dead Sons also playing over the weekend, amongst others. Weston Park hosted a stage for the first time in the festival's history.

=== 2013 ===
Tramlines 2013, took place from Friday 19th to Sunday 21 July. For the first time in the history of the festival, an entry fee was charged at £6 per day, though the event retained a large free fringe element.

=== 2014 ===
The main headlining acts were Katy B, Public Enemy, The Cribs and Annie Mac. The fee was increased to £12 per day, and early bird tickets were available in advance at £28 for all three days.

=== 2015 ===
Tramlines 2015 took place on Friday 24th to Sunday 26 July. The main stage moved from Devonshire Green to Ponderosa Park to increase the venue capacity. Tickets cost £30 for the weekend. Headliners included Sugar Hill Gang, Neneh Cherry, Slaves, The Charlatans, Basement Jaxx, and Buzzcocks.

=== 2016 ===
Tramlines 2016 took place on Friday 22nd to Sunday 24 July. Headliners included Dizzee Rascal and Catfish and the Bottlemen.

=== 2017 ===
Tramlines 2017 ran from Friday 21 July 2017 to Sunday 23 July 2017. Headliners included The Libertines, Metronomy, Primal Scream, The Coral, Kano and All Saints. 2017 also saw the return of the Devonshire Green stage, alongside the Ponderosa Park stage and The Folk Forest.

Friday 21 July	Saturday 22 July	Sunday 23 July
The Libertines; Twin Atlantic; Kano; The Pharcyde; Mista Silva; Champion; Ms. Banks	Primal Scream; We Are Scientists; Cabbage; Toots and the Maytals; Hot 8 Brass Band; All Saints; M.O; Spring King; Estrons; Alvarez Kings; Blaenavon; Yorkston/Thorne/Khan; Rachael Dadd; Flamingods; Jamie Isaac	Metronomy; Lady Leshurr; Loyle Carner; Nadia Rose; Akala; The Coral; The Big Moon; Lucy Spraggan; Omar Souleyman; Neil McSweeney; Fizzy Blood; Jerry Williams

=== 2018 ===
Tramlines 2018 ran from 20 July 2018 until 22 July at Hillsborough Park. Tickets were sold in six tiers with the first and second tier being sold out within days. Weekend admission tickets to Hillsborough Park cost £79. The line-up consists of Stereophonics, Noel Gallagher's High Flying Birds and Craig David's TS5 as well as other acts including Stefflon Don, Mabel, Blossoms, De La Soul, Jake Bugg, Clean Bandit, Everything Everything, Mystery Jets, Shed Seven, Milburn, Reverend and The Makers. The new capacity of the event was 40,000

The festival's namesake Supertram network went on strike for the duration of the 2018 festival, over pay and working conditions; free tram replacement buses were provided as shuttles between festival venues as a result.

Over £30,000 was raised at the festival in 2018 for both Cavendish Cancer Care and Weston Park Cancer Charity.

Friday 20 July	Saturday 21 July	Sunday 22 July
Stereophonics; Milburn; Everything Everything; The Big Moon; Mystery Jets; The Orielles; High Hazels	Noel Gallagher's High Flying Birds; Blossoms; Reverend and The Makers; Coasts; RedFaces; Clean Bandit; Stefflon Don; Mabel; Fickle Friends; Rat Boy; Rae Morris; Honeyblood; Flamingods; Self Esteem	Craig David presents TS5; De La Soul; Tokio Myers; The Sherlocks; Naaz; Mr Motivator; Jake Bugg; Shed Seven; Pale Waves; Little Comets; Gengahr; Nina Nesbitt; Tom Grennan; Teleman; Black Honey; PINS; Her's

=== 2019 ===
Tramlines 2019 was held from 19 July until 21 July in Hillsborough Park, headlined by Two Door Cinema Club, the Courteeners and Nile Rodgers & Chic. Other acts included the Manic Street Preachers, Rag'n'Bone Man, Doves, Happy Mondays, Reverend and The Makers, Johnny Marr, Sleeper, Peter Hook and the light, Miles Kane, Circa Waves, Lewis Capaldi and Shame. The main stage was renamed to Nulty’s Main Stage in honour of the late Festival Director, Sarah Nulty, who died just three weeks before the festival's 10th Anniversary in 2018.

Tramlines won the "Best Metropolitan Festival" award at the UK Festival Awards 2019, the second time the festival had won this award.

Friday 19 July	Saturday 20 July	Sunday 21 July
Two Door Cinema Club; Manic Street Preachers; Circa Waves; Sea Girls; The Futureheads; Clean Cut Kid; Easy Life; Himalayas; Redlight	Courteeners; Johnny Marr; Reverend and The Makers; Miles Kane; She Drew the Gun; Annie Mac; Jade Bird; Becky Hill; Georgia; Anteros; Shame; Jaws; The Japanese House; Skinny Living; Hands Off Gretel; Danny Howard	Nile Rodgers & Chic; Rag'n'Bone Man; Lewis Capaldi; Sleeper; Happy Mondays; Doves; Tom Grennan; Peter Hook and The Light; The Rifles; Drenge; Yonaka

=== 2020 (cancelled) ===
Tramlines 2020 was set to return to Hillsborough Park, Sheffield from Friday 31 July to Sunday 2 August 2020. On 7 May 2020 it was announced that the festival had been cancelled as a result of the social distancing measures that were in place to slow the spread of the COVID-19 pandemic. The line-up consisted of headliners Stone Roses frontman Ian Brown, Catfish and the Bottlemen and Madness, as well as The Kooks, Dizzee Rascal, The Hives, DMA's and Pale Waves. For the first time the second stage, t'Other was to be open for the full three days of the festival.

Friday 31 July	Saturday 1 August	Sunday 2 August
Ian Brown; The Kooks; Pale Waves; La Roux; The Pigeon Detectives; The Big Moon; The Lathums; The Blinders; Kawala; The Hara; Full Colour; Patawawa; Children of the State	Catfish and the Bottlemen; DMA's; Dizzee Rascal; The Sherlocks; Lucy Spraggan; The Magic Gang; Fickle Friends; Twisted Wheel; Vistas; Lauran Hibberd; Aaron Smith; Lucia & The Best Boys; Abbie Ozard; Sheafs; Everly Pregnant Brothers	Madness; The Hives; The Fratellis; Sister Sledge; Sundara Karma; Easy Life; The Snuts; The Orielles; The Reytons; Bedroom High Club; Clear Vinyl

=== 2021 ===
The festival returned in 2021, taking place between 23 and 25 July.

Friday 23 July	Saturday 24 July	Sunday 25 July
The Streets; The Kooks; Circa Waves; The Pigeon Detectives; The Blinders; Jake Bugg; Sophie Ellis-Bextor; The Slow Readers Club; Red Rum Club; The Rooves; Alfie Templeman; Billy Nomates	Royal Blood; Blossoms; The Sherlocks; The Lathums; Lucy Spraggan; Lauran Hibberd; Everly Pregnant Brothers; Before Breakfast; Mahalia; Little Simz; Georgia; Porridge Radio; Otis Mensah	Supergrass; Dizzee Rascal; Tom Walker; The Reytons; The Lottery Winners; The Fratellis; Everything Everything; Sundara Karma; The Snuts; Holly Humberstone; Ed Cosens; The Big Moon

=== 2022 ===
Tramlines 2022 ran from Friday 22 July to Sunday 24 July. The lineup was revealed in November 2021 and expanded in March 2022.

Friday 22 July	Saturday 23 July	Sunday 24 July
Sam Fender; James; Declan McKenna; Shed Seven; Bad Boy Chiller Crew; The Snuts; Jade Bird; Lady Leshurr; Orla Gartland; Working Men's Club; Baby Queen; Brooke Combe; The Clockworks; Coach Party; Kynsy; Lime Garden; August Charles; Harri Larkin	Kasabian; The Vaccines; Sigrid; Little Man Tate; Self Esteem; Inhaler; Sam Ryder; Alfie Templeman; Lottery Winners; KAWALA; Just Mustard; Crawlers; Bleach Lab; Swim School; SHEAFS; Pixey; Everly Pregnant Brothers	Madness; The Wombats; Becky Hill; Reverend and the Makers; Kelis; The Coral; Sports Team; Scouting for Girls; Yard Act; Elvana; Do Nothing; The Goa Express; April; Bedroom High Club; Luxury Goods

=== 2023 ===
Tramlines 2023 ran from Friday 21 July to Sunday 23 July. The initial lineup was revealed on 31 January 2023.

Friday 21 July	Saturday 22 July	Sunday 23 July
Richard Ashcroft; DMA's; Bloc Party; Sea Girls; Circa Waves; The Enemy; Pale Waves; Cian Ducrot; The Bug Club; Rachel Chinouriri; The Mary Wallopers; DEADLETTER; Dead Pony; Lizzie Esau; Rumbi Tauro; Amaroun; Jetski; Delilah Bon	Courteeners; Blossoms; Kate Nash; Katy B; Spector; Red Rum Club; Stone; Highschool; Prima Queen; Modernlove; Coco; October Drift; Franz Von; Vivas; Deuxe; JXK; DJ Lamour; Everly Pregnant Brothers	Paul Heaton & Jacqui Abbott; Kaiser Chiefs; Sugababes; Reverend and the Makers; The Zutons; Black Honey; The Beths; Wunderhorse; Matilda Mann; Courting; Creeping Jean; Weekend Recovery; Philippa Zawe

Additionally, the festival featured comedy performances by Jonathan Pie, Omid Djalili, Myq Kaplan, Tom Wrigglesworth and Jarred Christmas amongst others.

=== 2024 ===
Tramlines 2024 took place from Friday 26 July to Sunday 28 July. The initial lineup was revealed on 23 January 2024.

Friday 26 July	Saturday 27 July	Sunday 28 July
Paolo Nutini; Bombay Bicycle Club; The Charlatans; Soft Play; Sophie Ellis-Bextor; Miles Kane; The View; Dylan John Thomas; The Mysterines; Corella; Been Stellar; Coach Party; Bedroom High Club	Jamie T; Tom Grennan; The Snuts; Peace; Sprints; Jazzy; Nieve Ella; English Teacher; Coco; Cucamaras; Everly Pregnant Brothers	Snow Patrol; The Human League; Example; Yard Act; Maxïmo Park; The Magic Gang; Anthony Szimierek; flowerovlove; NewDad; Willie J Healey; 86TVs; Folly Group; Lime Garden

=== 2025 ===
Tramlines 2025 took place from Friday 25 July to Sunday 27 July. The initial lineup was revealed on 25 November 2024.

Friday 25 July	Saturday 26 July	Sunday 27 July
Pulp; Spiritualized; Baxter Dury; John Grant; Fat White Family; Hot Chip (DJ set); Lisa O'Neill; I Monster; Oracle Sisters; Femur	The Reytons; Franz Ferdinand; Rizzle Kicks; Natasha Bedingfield; Jake Bugg; The K's; Heather Small; The Futureheads; The Rosadocs; The Everly Pregnant Brothers	Kasabian; The Last Dinner Party; The Lathums; Sigrid; CMAT; Scouting For Girls; The Sherlocks; The Royston Club; Red Rum Club; Luvcat

=== 2026 ===
Tramlines 2026 took place from Friday 24 July to Sunday 26 July.

Friday 24 July	Saturday 25 July	Sunday 26 July
Fatboy Slim; Kaiser Chiefs; The Vaccines; The Coral; Vanessa Carlton; The K's; Starsailor; Black Honey; Keo; Radio Free Alice	Courteeners; Blossoms; Rick Astley; Gabrielle; Inspiral Carpets; Sleeper; Lucy Spraggan; Freddie Halkon; Creeping Jean; The Everly Pregnant Brothers	Wolf Alice; Wet Leg; Reverend and the Makers; The Enemy; The Royston Club; The Rosadocs; Brooke Combe; Florence Road; The Lilacs; Emmanuel Sonubi
