= Well Well Well =

Well Well Well may refer to:

- Well Well Well (album), a 2006 album by Milburn
- "Well Well Well" (John Lennon song), 1970
- "Well, Well, Well" (Lucinda Williams Song), 2008
- "Well, Well, Well" (Duffy song), 2010
- "Well, Well, Well", song by The Hives from Barely Legal
- "Well Well Well"", a song recorded by The Seekers
- "Well, Well, Well", a song by Le Tigre from Feminist Sweepstakes
- "Well, Well, Well", a song by Bob Dylan and Danny O'Keefe, recorded by several artists, including Ben Harper and The Blind Boys of Alabama of There Will Be a Light
