= New Bedford Cinema =

- O2 Academy Glasgow
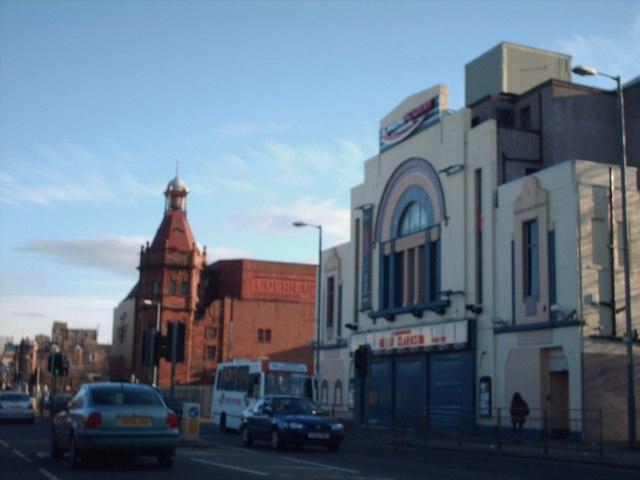
- The New Bedford Cinema pictured as the Carling Academy in 2003
- Interactive map of the New Bedford Cinema area
- Former names: Carling Academy

General information
- Status: Completed
- Type: Cinema/Concert Hall
- Architectural style: Art Deco
- Location: Gorbals, Glasgow, Scotland
- Coordinates: 55°51′02″N 4°15′34″W
- Opened: 1932
- Owner: Academy Music Group

Design and construction
- Architects: Lennox and McMath

Other information
- Seating capacity: 2,500

The New Bedford Cinema was a Scottish cinema on Eglinton Street in the Gorbals (Laurieston) area of Glasgow. The building now houses the O_{2} Academy Glasgow.

It is a notable example of Art Deco architecture in the city.

== History ==
The building was originally erected as the Eglinton Street United Secession Church in 1825. The church closed in 1920 and the building was converted into a cinema in 1921. The original Bedford Cinema was destroyed by a fire in March 1932. The cinema's owner, Bernard Frutin, immediately commissioned a replacement.

The New Bedford was designed by Lennox and McMath and was built by Mr A.B. King. The newly built cinema was opened on 26 December (Boxing Day) 1932.

Bernard Frutin sold the cinema to George Green in 1936.

The New Bedford Cinema screened its final film, a double bill of Dirty Harry and Klute, on 8 July 1973 and reopened on 12 October 1973 as a Mecca bingo hall.

It was designated as a category B listed building on 17 June 1986 by Historic Scotland.

The building was bought by the McKenzie Group in November 2002 and underwent a massive £3 million restoration to be turned into the Carling Academy, Glasgow which opened on 26 March 2003 with a concert by Deacon Blue. The building was renamed in 2008 and is now known as the O2 Academy Glasgow.
