= Newcastle City Baths =

Swimming facility in Newcastle upon Tyne, England

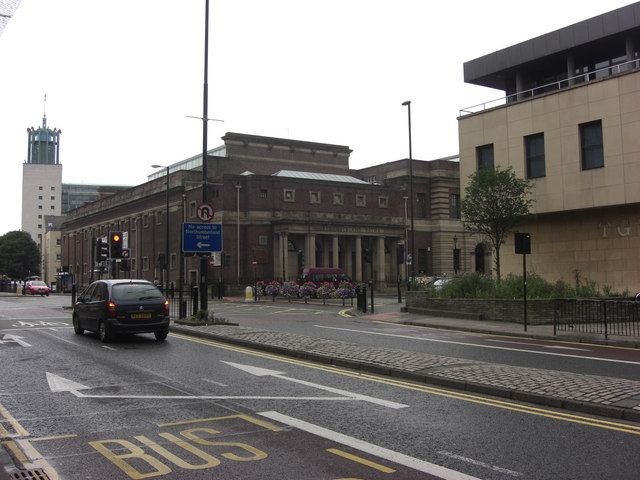
- Exterior of venue (c.2009)
- Interactive map of Newcastle City Baths
- Location: Northumberland Road; Newcastle upon Tyne; England, NE1 8SF
- Coordinates: 54.9773°N 1.6107°W
- Operator: Fusion
- Facilities: Gym, swimming pool

Construction
- Opened: 1927
- Architect: Nicholas & Dixon-Spain

Website
- Venue Website

Listed Building – Grade II
- Official name: Northumberland Baths / City Hall
- Designated: 8 May 1992
- Reference no.: 1242013

The Newcastle City Baths is a swimming and sports facility located in Newcastle upon Tyne, England. It is a Grade II listed building, with a Victorian-style Turkish baths.

== History ==
The building was commissioned to replace the ageing Northumberland Baths on Northumberland Road, which were designed by John Dobson and completed in 1838. The new building was designed by Nicholas & Dixon-Spain and opened on 7 November 1928 as a part of a development which also included the adjacent Newcastle City Hall. The city baths formed the west side of the complex and, like the city hall, the design involved a tall portico with central Doric order columns between flanking antae with five square windows above.

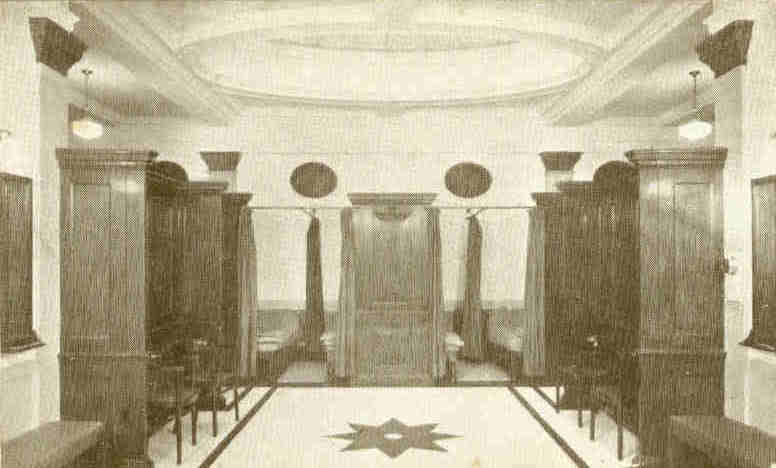
The cooling-room of the Turkish baths

The Turkish baths were unique among those provided by local authorities. Whereas hot air was normally directed into the hottest room and passed onwards to the others (cooling as it progressed), in these baths, fresh filtered clean air at the required temperature was fed into each hot room separately. The cooling-room had a simple inlaid floor decoration, a circular glazed dome, curtained changing and relaxation cubicles, and mahogany panelled furniture and doors.

In November 2012, Newcastle City Council announced that, as part of a wider cost-cutting process, the future of the City Hall and the adjacent City Baths was under review, with a number of options being considered including closure or handing over the venue to an external operator.

In April 2016 it was announced that the Fusion Lifestyle, a leisure charity, had taken over management of the venue and work commenced on a restoration programme at a cost of £7.5 million, which involved converting the main swimming pool into a gym area while a second, smaller pool, was retained for swimming. The gym and swimming pool re-opened to the public in January 2020, and, following restoration of the building's glass dome, the Turkish baths re-opened in April 2024.
