= Dead Sons =

English rock band

- Also known as: The Backhanded Compliments (2009–2010)
- Origin: Sheffield, England
- Genre: Stoner rock
- Years active: 2009–2014; 2015–present
- Label: Crystal Ship
- Spinoffs: Howls
- Spinoff of: Milburn
- Past members: Thomas Rowley; Ryan Sellars; Matthew Byrne; Luke Baker; Joseph Green
- Website: www.deadsons.co.uk

Dead Sons are an English rock band formed in Sheffield, featuring two ex-members of Milburn (Thomas Rowley and Joe Green).

== History ==
The band formed in spring 2010, with Sheffield band 'The Backhanded Compliments' reforming the group under its current name following the addition of two new members. Dead Sons spent several months in a studio in Sheffield city centre practising and rehearsing, before playing their first show to a capacity crowd at Tramlines Festival 2010. Unusually, the band chose Montgomery Theatre (a 420-seater venue opposite Sheffield Town Hall, usually host to dramatic performances) as the venue to launch their debut official White Label release of the well-received "I Am The Lord", supported by a UK tour. "I Am The Lord" / "City Nights" was released on 7" Vinyl in February 2011.

They released their second single, "Junk Room" on 30 May 2011, and the song was available for free download on their official website until early July. This coincided with their biggest ever show supporting the Arctic Monkeys in a custom tent holding 10,000 people at Don Valley Stadium, in one of only two UK shows on Friday 10 June 2011. The supporting slot attracted some interest from music journalists, with Drowned In Sound dubbing Junk Room "a big fat stomp through psychedelia and desert rock". The band released their next single, "Berlin" as another free download on their official website on 18 July 2011. Dead Sons performed at Tramlines Festival 2011 at Main outdoor stage on Sunday 24 July, shortly followed by a show with Club NME at Koko on Friday 29 July. Dead Sons toured their latest EP, Boom Boom (released 10 October) in Autumn 2011.

The single from the EP, "Shotgun Woman", gained the band substantial recognition in Turkey, earning them a number 2 slot in the Turkish Music Charts. and over 100k views on YouTube.

Another major support slot was gained in July 2012 when they supported fellow Sheffield band Reverend & The Makers at that year's Tramlines Festival, performing in front of over 5,000 people.

The single "Hangman" was released on Bonfire night of 2012, shortly followed by an over capacity crowd for their single release at The Bowery in Sheffield. Dead Sons' debut album The Hollers & The Hymns was released worldwide on 18 February 2013.

In 2015, the band announced they would reform to play at least one reunion show while Arctic Monkeys were on a between-album hiatus. The show was heavily rumoured to be a secret set at Sheffield's Tramlines Festival to mark the five-year anniversary of the band's first show, though they later made it clear that it was simply a rumour and nothing more.

Dead Sons started work on a second album, but these plans were later postponed. Tom Rowley has gone on to become a longtime touring member of the Arctic Monkeys and has been on two world tours with the band as well as writing on the band's two most recent albums, Tranquility Base Hotel & Casino and The Car. Luke Baker, Joe Green and Ryan Sellars continued under the moniker 'Howls'.

In late September 2018, Dead Sons made an announcement that they would be returning with rumours of new music and live shows.

In June 2025, fans were still awaiting their return.

== Members ==
- Thomas Rowley - vocals, organ, piano, guitars
- Ryan Sellars - bass
- Mathew 'Bernie' Byrne - percussion, marimbas, harmonica, vocals, guitars
- Luke Baker - guitars, vocals, organ, piano
- Joseph Green - drums, percussion

== Discography ==
=== Albums ===
- The Hollers And The Hymns (2013)

=== EPs ===
- Boom Boom (2011)

=== Singles ===
Single	Year	Peak position
Single	Year	Turkey
"I Am The Lord/City Nights"	2011	1
"Junk Room"	2011	1
"Berlin"	2011	1
"Shotgun Woman"	2011	2
"Bangonfullturn"	2012	35
"Room 54"	2012	1
"Hangman"	2012	23
"Gasoline"	2013	4
