= These Are the Facts =

These Are The Facts

Studio album by Milburn
- Released: 24 September 2007
- Recorded: Sawmills Studios, Cornwall; Elevator Studios, Liverpool; 2Fly Studios, Sheffield
- Genre: Indie rock
- Length: 38:33
- Label: Mercury Records
- Producer: Alan Smyth

Milburn chronology
Well Well Well (2006)	These Are The Facts (2007)	Time (2017)

Professional ratings
Review scores
Source	Rating
This Is Fake DIY	3/5 stars
Q	3/5 stars

These Are the Facts is the second album by the Sheffield band Milburn. The album was released on 24 September 2007 in the UK on Mercury Records.

== Release ==
The song "What Will You Do (When the Money Goes)?" was released on 17 September 2007, as the first single released from These Are the Facts. On 23 September 2007 it entered the UK Singles Chart at #44 from digital download purchases alone.

== Track listing ==
No.	Title	Length
1.	"Lo and Behold"	1:55
2.	"What Will You Do (When the Money Goes)?"	3:54
3.	"Wolves At Bay"	3:02
4.	"Summertime"	4:11
5.	"Lucy Lovemenot"	2:12
6.	"Sinking Ships"	2:54
7.	"Cowboys And Indians"	3:23
8.	"Being A Rogue"	3:03
9.	"Count To 10"	3:33
10.	"Come Away With Me"	3:29
11.	"Rubicon"	2:52
12.	"The Genius And The Tramp"	4:11
