= Party Day =

English rock band

- Origin: Wombwell, Barnsley, South Yorkshire, England
- Genres: Post-punk; gothic rock; indie rock; cold wave; new wave
- Years active: 1981–1988
- Labels: Party Day Records, Rouska Records, PIAS Recordings (Play it Again Sam Records), Optic Nerve Recordings, AAZ Records, Torment Records, Strobelight Records.
- Past members: Mick Baker - drums (1981–1988); Martin Steele - guitar, vocals (1981–1985); Carl Firth - bass, vocals (1981–1986); Greg Firth - guitar (1981–1982); Dean Peckett - guitar, vocals (1985–1988); Paul Nash - guitar, vocals (1986–1988); Shaun Crowcroft - bass (1986–1988)

Party Day were an English rock band formed in 1981 in Wombwell near Barnsley, South Yorkshire, England. Originally, a four-piece consisting of guitarists Martin Steele, Greg Firth, bassist Carl Firth and drummer Mick Baker. They were known for being "hard knuckleduster goth with post-punk overtones".

== History ==
The band were formerly called 'Further Experiments' (1979–81) but refocused as Party Day. They released their first single, "Row the Boat Ashore" c/w "Poison" on their own label, Party Day Records in 1983, and it was well reviewed - "their simpering and delightful sound is a thing of beauty".

Their second single, "The Spider", was described as "Excellent punk junk howl" and was played on John Peel's BBC Radio 1.

Their debut album ‘Glasshouse’ (1985) has received acclaim in Andrew Darlington's blog post: "their most stunning statement to date... what they do, they do searingly well".

Party Day's music was melancholic at heart with a drop of venomous punk, and as with their second album, Simplicity (1986)'s track "Glorious Days" was called "the attractive, though slightly over-wrought black sheep."

Party Day released Rabbit Pie on the compilation LP Giraffe in Flames on Aaz Records to acclaim: "Highlight though is Party Day's effort, a meaty guitar-based number, Rabbit Pie. The threesome is coming on by leaps and bounds, and Giraffe in Flames is worth buying just for them."

They had a strong following in Yorkshire and were credited as being part of both the local scenes of Sheffield ( Leadmill ) and Leeds. "No strangers to the local circuit, Party Day have gigged consistently for almost a year".

After the release of the Glasshouse LP there was a change in personnel, with Martin leaving due to ill-health. Other members joined, but by 1988, they had broken up after abandoning their unfinished third album.

Sounds said "They roar along, driven by a good old-fashioned pumping drum-kit, and every so often one of those elusive moving chord-sequences falls into place, leaving you completely startled". The NME writes "They hold their guitars like loaded AK-47s. They throb".

Since their demise, there has been quite an interest in the band. They were included within Mick Mercer's book Gothic Rock: All you ever wanted to know but were too afraid to ask, published by Pegasus 1991 (UK) ISBN 1-873892-01-2 and Cleopatra Records 1993 (USA).

Their song "Atoms" has been included on some later Gothic compilations, most notably with Germany's Strobelight Records - Volume 3 (2006). In 2015, their songs could be found being aired at Gothic clubs within Europe and beyond, on Livestreams. Recently, they aired on World Goth Day 2020 with DJ Benny Blanco's Livestream and with Dark Wave Radio.

2021 sees the 40th Anniversary of the Band's beginnings. Sorted! becomes the band's latest release, a comprehensive collection of all their recordings plus demos, and is released by Optic Nerve Recordings.

== Discography ==
=== Singles ===
- "Row The Boat Ashore" c/w "Poison" (1983, Party Day Records)
- "Spider" c/w "Flies" (1984, Party Day Records)

=== EPs ===
- Glasshouse EP(1985, Rouska Records)

=== Albums ===
- Glasshouse (1985, Party Day Records)
- Simplicity (1986, Party Day Records)
- Sorted! (2021, Optic Nerve Recordings)

=== Compilations ===
- "Party Day" on Real Time 5 (1983, Unlikely Records [cassette])
- "Rabbit Pie" on Giraffe in Flames (1984, AAZ Records [12" vinyl])
- "Rabbit Pie" on Band-It No. 14 (1984, [cassette magazine])
- "Athena" on Four Your Ears Only (1984, Play it Again Sam [12" vinyl])
- "Opium Gathering" on Raw Red Heat (1984, Flame Tapes [cassette])
- "Spider" on Raging Sun (1985, Rouska Records [12" vinyl])
- "Borderline" on Bites and Stabs (1985, Torment Records [12" vinyl])
- "Let Us Shine" on Torn in Two (1986, Torment Records)
- "Let us Shine" on Zarah Leander's Greatest Hits (1987, Rouska Records [CD])
- "Atoms" on Strobelights Vol.3 (2006, Strobelight Records [CD])
- "Atoms" on Return of the Batcave - Vol. 1 (2008, internet only [CD])
