= Hmv Empire =

Entertainment venue in Coventry, England

hmv Empire
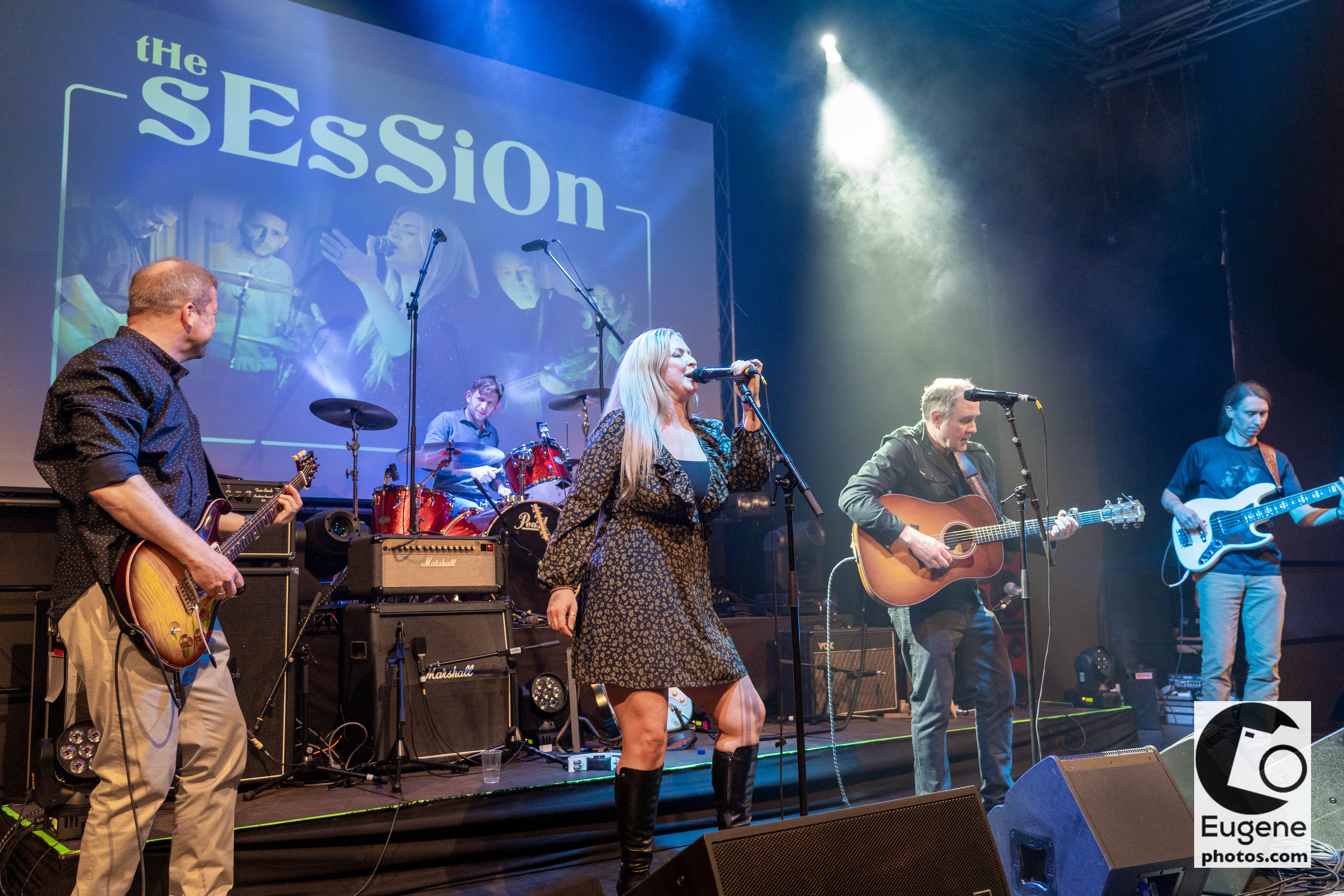
- The hmv Empire on Hertford Street, Coventry
- Interactive map of hmv Empire
- Former names: The Empire (2015–2020)
- Address: 22 Hertford Street; Coventry, West Midlands; CV1 1LF
- Location: Coventry City Centre
- Coordinates: 52°24′28.8″N 1°30′43.2″W
- Owner: Phil Rooney
- Capacity: 1,200
- Type: Live music and entertainment venue

Construction
- Built: 1973 (as ABC Cinema)
- Opened: 2015 (original site); 11 June 2021 (current site)
- Closed: 2020 (original Far Gosford Street site)
- Demolished: 2022 (original site interior structure)

Website
- www.hmvempire.com

hmv Empire is a 1,200-capacity live music and entertainment venue in Coventry, England. It is notable as the only venue in the United Kingdom to hold an exclusive naming-rights partnership with the entertainment retailer hmv. The site opened in 2021 to mark hmv's centenary. Originally founded in 2015 in Far Gosford Street, where it operated as an official regional home for Club NME, the venue relocated to Hertford Street in 2021 as a key infrastructure project for Coventry's tenure as the UK City of Culture.

== History ==
The Empire was established in September 2015 at 150-151 Far Gosford Street, occupying a locally listed building originally constructed in 1912 as the Crown Cinema. Local band The Enemy, gave the first live performance at the venue before it became a prominent fixture on the UK touring circuit, with acts like Pete Doherty, White Lies, The Libertines and Frank Turner.

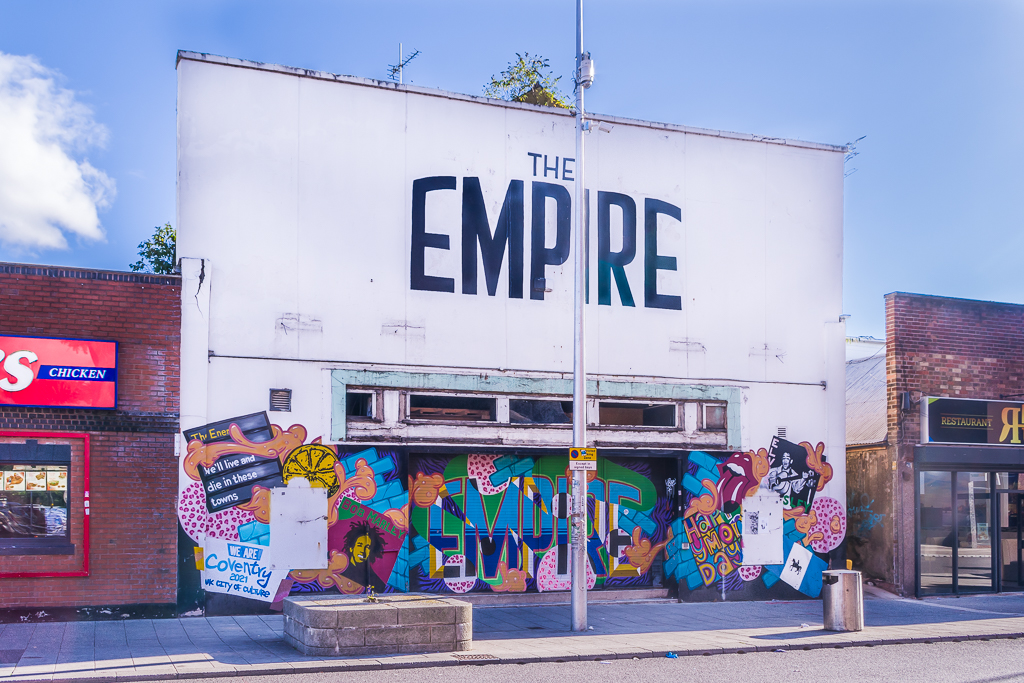
The preserved 1912 facade of the original venue on Far Gosford Street, which was vacated in 2020.

The Empire permanently vacated its original home at the beginning of 2020 following the expiration of its lease, clearing the way for a proposed five-storey student accommodation development. Following the venue's departure, the interior structure was demolished in late 2022. The student accommodation complex opened in late 2024.

While public and planning debates regarding the future of the vacant Far Gosford Street site were ongoing, in early 2021 the venue's operators secured a new location at the former ABC Cinema on Hertford Street. The venue entered into a three-year naming rights partnership with hmv and reopened as the hmv Empire. The new venue, with a capacity of 1,200, officially opened on 11 June 2021 with a socially distanced performance by Al Murray.

On 25 August 2021, Ed Sheeran performed a free concert at the venue as part of UK City of Culture activities. Approximately 700 people attended the performance in person, while a live stream was shown to an audience of around 3,000 at Assembly Festival Gardens, Coventry.

Since reopening, the hmv Empire has hosted performances by artists including Tom Grennan, Arlo Parks, Fatboy Slim, Jessie Ware and Maxïmo Park.
