= The Dome, London =

North London Music venue, in a former public baths

The Dome
- Interactive map of The Dome
- Former names: Stanley Hall & Baths; Electric Theatre; Stanley Cinema; Harper’s Clubroom; Tufnell Park Palais; The Boston Club; Boston Music Room
- Address: 2a Dartmouth Park Hill; London, UK
- Coordinates: 51.557459°N 0.13838°W
- Capacity: Upstairs: 600; Downstairs: 300
- Type: Music venue
- Events: Rock, metal, indie, pop
- Current use: Live Music Venue
- Public transit: Tufnell Park

Construction
- Built: 1884
- Opened: April 1885
- Reopened: June 1909; 1981
- Builder: E. H. Blunt

Website
- www.domelondon.co.uk

The Dome is an independent music venue situated in the heart of Tufnell Park, London, England. The venue is a part of the connecting Boston Arms pub, that was constructed on the corner of Dartmouth Park Hill and Junction Road in 1881. Upstairs the venue has a capacity of 600, and downstairs the venue has a capacity of 300, with both spaces being used for a whole host of activities across the years.

== History ==
Built in 1884, and opened in April 1885. The building originally contained a 60-foot swimming bath on the ground floor and a public assembly hall above. Built around the same time, the nearby Acland Burghley School was overseen by the vice chairman of the London School Board, the Honourable E. Lyulph Stanley, son of Lady Stanley. It is believed that the building was named the Stanley Hall & Baths after E. Lyulph Stanley, who potentially put up funding for its construction.

The school used the off site assembly hall to host their annual concert and distribution of medals ceremony. The School was also known to have used the swimming pool extensively.

=== Cinema ===
In 1909, the swimming pool was converted into a second assembly hall and used as a cinema, called the Electric Theatre, opening in June 1909. The cinema was later rebranded as the Stanley Cinema, in March 1914, and remained opened until 1916, likely closing due to the First World War.

=== Wrestling ===
Following WWI, the space was used for wrestling under the name of Tufnell Park Palais. The Palais also held other events such as concerts, including one with Matt Monro.

=== Live Music Venue ===
In 1981, the venue reopened as an independent music venue. The upstairs space was called The Dome, whilst the downstairs was called The Boston Music Room. The two spaces have seen a whole host of acts perform throughout the years such as Coldplay, Bring Me the Horizon, Blur, Primal Scream, Noel Gallagher, and many many more.

=== Amex Unsigned Refurbish and Rebrand ===
In 2023, the venue played host to the American Express Unsigned initiative, which aims to back UK grassroots venues and helps create breakthrough opportunities for emerging music talent. During this time the venues branding was refreshed, with the Boston Music Room being renamed as Downstairs At The Dome. A documentary about the event and refurbishment was published to Amazon Prime in December 2024 called ‘'Unsigned: Backing The Dream'’.
