= Well Well Well (album) =

Studio album by Milburn
- Released: 9 October 2006
- Recorded: Jacobs Studio, Surrey; Steelworks Studios, Sheffield
- Genre: Indie rock
- Length: 37:30
- Label: Mercury Records
- Producer: Dave Eringa; James Barber; Shanks

Milburn chronology
Well Well Well (2006)	These Are the Facts (2007)

Professional ratings
Review scores
Source	Rating
AllMusic	3.5/5 stars
Drowned in Sound	2/5 stars
The Guardian	3/5 stars
Rocklouder	2/5 stars

Well Well Well is the debut album by the Sheffield band Milburn. The album was released on 9 October 2006 in the United Kingdom on Mercury Records. It was leaked onto the internet about a month before release. A limited edition first pressing includes numbered slipcase and four extra tracks.

== Release ==
The song "Send in the Boys" was released on 27 March 2006 as the first single taken from the album and the band's first to chart in the UK Top 40, peaking at #22.

The song "Cheshire Cat Smile" was released on 10 July 2006. It charted in the UK Top 40 at #32. The DVD features two live recordings taken at The Leadmill on 4 March 2006. The last single, "What You Could've Won", was released on 30 October 2006. It charted at #66 in the UK.

== Track listing ==
No.	Title	Length
1.	"Well Well Well"	3:21
2.	"Showroom"	3:15
3.	"Send in the Boys"	2:43
4.	"What About Next Time"	3:29
5.	"Lipstick Licking"	2:33
6.	"Cheshire Cat Smile"	2:16
7.	"Stockholm Syndrome"	2:56
8.	"Storm in a Teacup"	3:33
9.	"Last Bus"	3:06
10.	"Brewster"	2:52
11.	"What You Could've Won]"	4:15
12.	"Roll Out the Barrel"	3:11

1. "Let Me Go" – 3:01 (Bonus track)
2. "December" – 2:54 (Bonus track)
3. "17" – 3:00 (Bonus track)
4. "Brewster" (Featuring Billy Bragg) – 3:50 (Bonus track)

== Charts ==
Chart (2006)	Peak position
UK Albums Chart	32
