= Keo =

Keo or KEO may refer to:

- Keo, another name for the Thổ people
- The KEO satellite
- Communist Unification Group (Greek: Κομμουνιστική Ενωτική Ομάδα) or KEO, a defunct political party
- KEO (beer), a brand of beer brewed in Cyprus
- KEO (company), the largest beverage company in Cyprus
- Keo, Estonia, a village in Estonia
- Keo, Arkansas, a town in the United States
- K. E. O. abbreviation for "King Edward's Own", as in several Indian regiments:

- 2nd King Edward VII's Own Gurkha Rifles (The Sirmoor Rifles)
- 6th King Edward's Own Cavalry
- 11th King Edward's Own Lancers (Probyn's Horse)
- 18th King Edward's Own Cavalry

== Surname ==
Keo is a Khmer surname (កែវ) and a surname in other cultures. People with this surname include:

- Keo Meas (1926–1976), Cambodian communist politician
- Keo Puth Rasmey (born 1952), Cambodian politician, Funcinpec party leader
- Keo Remy (born 1963), Cambodian cabinet member
- Keo Pich Pisey (born 1982), Cambodian actress
- Shiloh Keo (born 1987), American football safety
- Elvinn Keo (born 1988), Malaysian squash player
- Keo Sokpheng (born 1992), Cambodian football forward
- Keo Soksela (born 1997), Cambodian football goalkeeper
- Keo Saphal (Siem Reap politician), Cambodian politician
- Keo Saphal (Takeo politician), Cambodian politician

== Given name ==
- Keo Nakama (1920–2011), American swimmer
- Keo Woolford (1967–2016), American actor, producer, and director
- Keo Coleman (born 1970), American football linebacker
- Keo Motsepe (born 1989), South African dancer
- Keo Nozari (fl. 2000s), American singer-songwriter
