= The Leadmill =

Music venue in Sheffield, South Yorkshire, England

Coordinates: 53.3762°N 1.4649°W

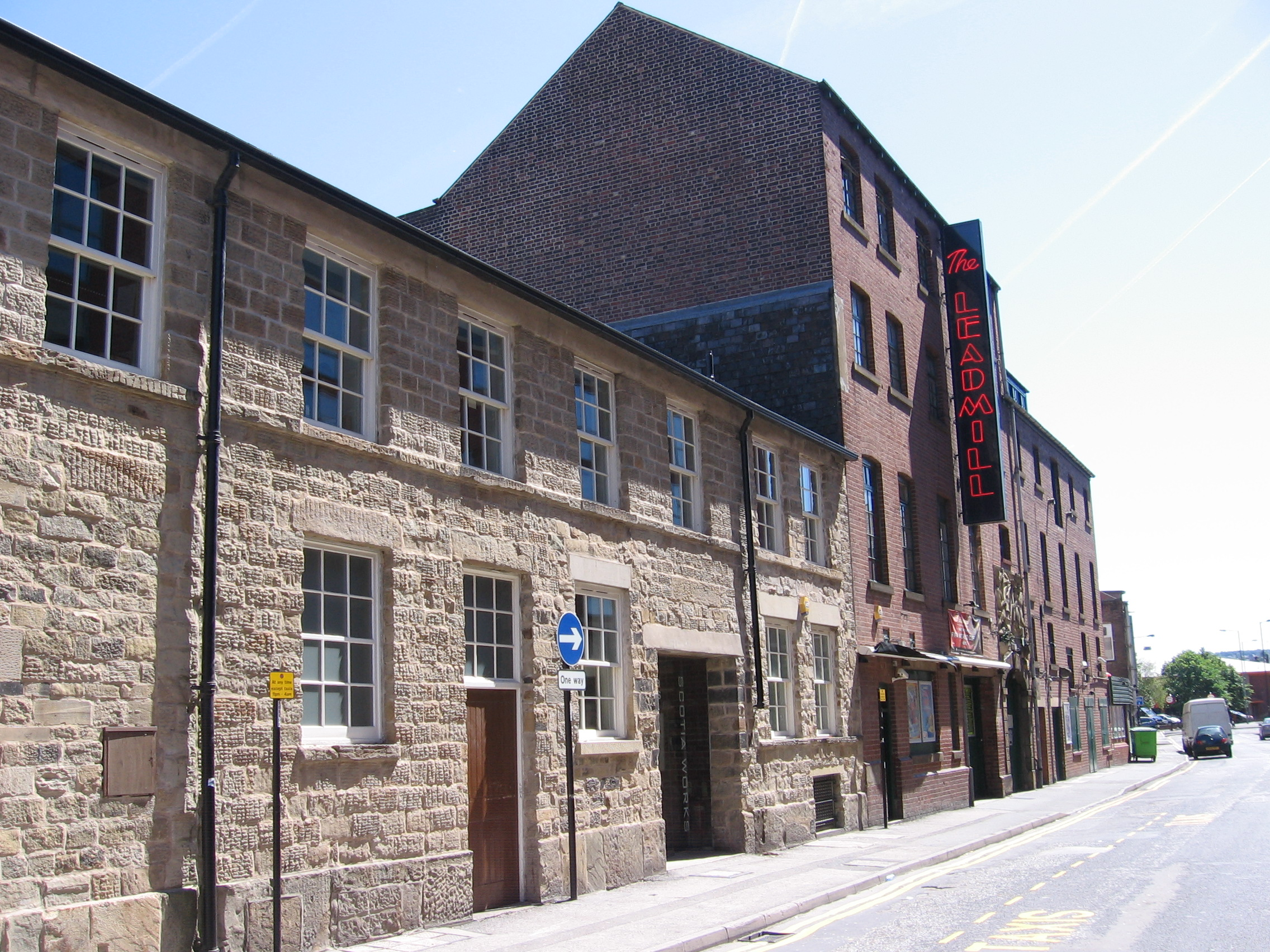
- Interactive map of The Leadmill
- Capacity: 900
- Public transit: B P Granville Road

Construction
- Opened: 1980
- Closed: 27 June 2025

Website
- www.leadmill.co.uk

The Leadmill was the longest running live music venue and nightclub in Sheffield, in the county of South Yorkshire, England, based on Leadmill Road, lying on the southeast edge of the city centre. It opened in 1980 in a former flour mill, originally a Community Centre, and closed on 27 June 2025.

The venue hosted live music, comedians, theatre productions, record fairs, cabaret, drag, and talks.

== History ==
The Leadmill first opened in 1980 in the building that previously housed the Esquire, a 1960s club that had hosted gigs by Jimi Hendrix and Small Faces. The Esquire was housed in one of the upper floors of the building that is now occupied by the box office.

Originally acting as a community centre, the venue was not granted an alcohol license until 1982 and so initially hosted plays, education and training workshops and live music. In the early 1980s, the Leadmill had a mission statement to promote the education of the public in the arts and to promote social welfare by providing recreational and leisure-time facilities. The young and unemployed were the central focus of the venue throughout the 1980s.

Early events at the venue included a 1982 pantomime directed by Jarvis Cocker, and the Housemartins queuing for their own 1984 gig, but being turned away by bouncers. The venue also hosted the Festival Against Unemployment in September 1982, promoting local bands; New Model Soldier, Party Day and Agent Orange. Jazz For Lunch, an afternoon live music event, was often held on Sundays throughout the 1980s.

In 1988, Prince Charles visited the Leadmill. He described it as "a building well restored" and went on to say, "It houses a theatre, live music venue, educational and training centre, not to mention a restaurant, bar, nightclub, and, they say, it makes a profit!".

In the 1990s the Leadmill became the Sheffield home of Gatecrasher before launching its own house night RISE. Sheffield's Arctic Monkeys sold out the Leadmill in 2005, quicker than any other band.

In 2017, the venue began renovation work which included tearing up the original dance floor to make way for a new one. Instead of throwing it away, the venue decided to cut it up into individual engraved pieces for customers to purchase. In addition to the new dancefloor, the venue also revealed a new mezzanine floor in the back right corner of the main room. 2017 also saw the venue host its first comedy festival with 55 acts taking to the stage over the space of a week.

On 13 March 2026 Electric Studios opened which is the new name for the venue with an increased capacity of 1,050, after a major £2m refurbishment and under new ownership.

=== COVID-19 pandemic ===
With panic buying taking place during the COVID-19 pandemic in 2020, the venue sold toilet roll at cost price. A spokesperson from the Leadmill said: "The shop around the corner from us started selling toilet rolls for £1 each, so we bought 2,000 from our suppliers and are selling them at the same cost, four for £1.83".

Eventually due to government lockdown restrictions during the pandemic, the Leadmill was temporarily closed. The venue auctioned off memorabilia, including signed items, to raise money to pay staff wages and to ensure its future. Also during this period of closure, the venue launched a Crowdfunder to pay essential overheads and to support the nationwide campaign, #SaveOurVenues, which aimed to ensure no music venues closed as a result of the pandemic. This was supported by online gigs promoted by the Leadmill via their Facebook page. Billy Bragg's online concert raised over £15,000 for the fund.

=== 2022 eviction ===
On 31 March 2022, the Leadmill announced that it had been served an eviction notice by landlords Electric Group, ordering them to quit the building in March 2023. Electric Group, who own a portfolio of music venues in London, Bristol and Newcastle, made a statement announcing their intention to continue the site as a refurbished music venue. However, Leadmill management claimed that it owned the brand and that any new venue on the site could not use the Leadmill name. The news drew condemnation from a variety of bands and musicians including Billy Bragg, Kaiser Chiefs, Reverend and the Makers and Manic Street Preachers and saw a joint letter from Sheffield's five Labour MPs to Culture Secretary Nadine Dorries asking for an urgent discussion on how to save the venue. On 19 May 2023, Def Leppard played a one-off gig at the venue, in order to shed a light on the venue's plight. The Leadmill ceased operation on 27 June 2025, with a final concert by Miles Kane; the final song to be played in the venue was "My Way" by Frank Sinatra.

== Notable acts ==
Many notable musicians and acts performed at the venue, including The Chemical Brothers, The Dandy Warhols, Jorja Smith, Rick Astley, Beabadoobee, Culture Club, The Strokes, George Ezra, Lewis Capaldi, Creeper, Haze, James Marriott, Muse, Two Door Cinema Club, Arctic Monkeys, The Verve, Queens of the Stone Age, Coldplay, The Killers, Kings of Leon, Holding Absence, Pulp, Tame Impala, Inhaler, Scouting for Girls, Jamiroquai and Alfie Templeman.

Comedians who headlined the venue included James Acaster, Ed Gamble, Joe Lycett, Nish Kumar, Eddie Izzard and Rachel Parris.

== Awards ==
The venue was voted favourite live music venue by readers of NME on several occasions. The Leadmill won 'Best Live Venue' at the Exposed Awards several times, most recently in 2019. The Leadmill was awarded a Music Heritage Award by PRS for Music in 2015, which was unveiled by Pulp at an event broadcast live from the venue on BBC 6 Music's Steve Lamacq show. It also won 'Best Venue Teamwork' at the LIVE UK Awards in 2011 and 2015.

== External events ==
Three 7,500 capacity outdoor events were held at Don Valley Bowl in 2018. This run of events was nominated for 'Best Local Event' at the 2019 Exposed Awards.

The venue promoted several cinematic events at Sheffield General Cemetery as part of their Halloween events in 2019.

When Tramlines Festival made the move from a city centre festival to an all-in-one site at Hillsborough Park, the Leadmill had a stage named after it, with up-and-coming artists alongside comedians.
