= Newcastle City Hall =

Concert hall in Newcastle, England

O_{2} City Hall Newcastle
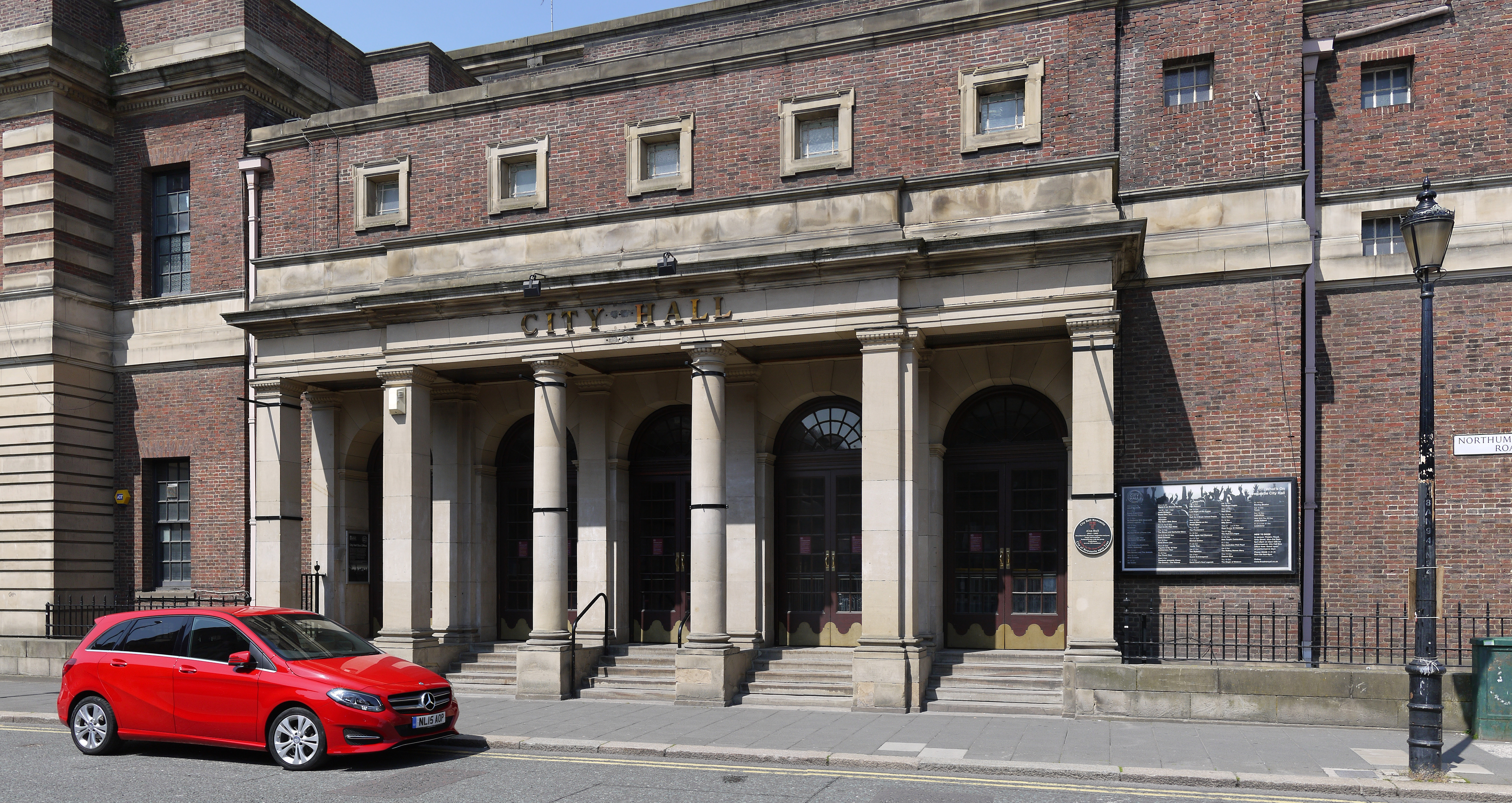
- Exterior of venue (c.2018)
- Interactive map of O_{2} City Hall Newcastle
- Former names: Newcastle City Hall (1927-2019)
- Address: Northumberland Road; Newcastle upon Tyne NE1 8SF England
- Coordinates: 54.9774°N 1.6102°W
- Operator: Academy Music Group
- Capacity: 2,135
- Type: Concert hall

Construction
- Opened: 1928

Website
- Venue Website

Listed Building – Grade II
- Official name: Northumberland Baths / City Hall
- Designated: 8 May 1992
- Reference no.: 1242013

The Newcastle City Hall (currently known as O_{2} City Hall Newcastle for sponsorship reasons) is a concert hall located in Newcastle upon Tyne, England. It has hosted many popular music and classical artists throughout the years, as well as standup and comedy acts. The venue is operated by Academy Music Group, which is part owned by Live Nation, and named under a group sponsorship agreement with telecoms company O_{2}. It is a Grade II listed building.

== History ==
The building was designed by Nicholas & Dixon-Spain and opened on 7 November 1928 as a part of a development which also included the adjacent Northumberland Baths, later renamed The Newcastle City Baths. It has since become a venue for orchestras, rock and pop bands, and comedy acts, as well as for celebrity recitals, talks and civic functions. The city hall formed the east side of the complex and, like the city baths, the design involved a tall portico with central Doric order columns between flanking antae with five square windows above.

In November 2012, Newcastle City Council announced that, as part of a wider cost-cutting process, the future of the City Hall and the adjacent City Pool was under review, with a number of options being considered including closure or handing over the venue to an external operator. Council leader Nick Forbes pre-empted the outcome of the consultations process by stating that the City Hall has "No long-term future". In response, a 13,000 name petition against closure was presented to Newcastle City Council by members of the Facebook "North East Music History Group" on 31 January 2013.

In April 2016 it was announced that the Theatre Royal Trust had taken over management of the venue and, in May 2019, the Theatre Royal Trust transferred the City Hall operations to Academy Music Group, and the venue was renamed as O_{2} City Hall Newcastle.

== Organ ==
An organ, design and built by Harrison and Harrison was installed in 1928, to enable the building to operate as the city's first dedicated concert venue. A concert instrument, as opposed to a cathedral specification, it has been used for choral and orchestral concerts as well as organ recitals. It has 4,274 pipes, with a number of unique stops and has been described as "A Rolls-Royce" of organs.

The organ is currently in a poor state of repair, although as a result of its neglect, the instrument is probably the last and largest example of a Harrison tubular-pneumatic action (most other large organs were converted to electro-pneumatic action after World War II). The organ is also unusual in that it is unaltered, as most comparable organs have been modified, added-to or revoiced.

The British Institute of Organ Studies awarded it a Grade 1 Historic Organ Certificate in 2003, and the significance of the organ was taken into account as part of the assessment of the hall's Grade II listed building status.

== Notable musical acts ==
The building was used as a public venue from an early stage and concert performers included the contralto singer, Kathleen Ferrier, who made an appearance on 22 April 1953.

Bob Dylan performed there during his 1965 tour of England on 6 May 1965. English rock band The Rolling Stones performed at the City Hall with American R&B duo Ike & Tina Turner and English rock band The Yardbirds on 1 October 1966.

The rock band The Who appeared at the City Hall in October 1967, and the local R&B band The Animals reunited and performed for a one-off performance at the City Hall in 1968.

On 7 May 1971, American rock band The Byrds performed there as part of their 1971 UK Tour and, in December 1976, as a one-off gig, local folk rock band Lindisfarne played three sell-out concerts in the City Hall.

The rock group Emerson, Lake & Palmer recorded their live album Pictures at an Exhibition there on 26 March 1971: Keith Emerson played the whole first Promenade on the City Hall organ.

On April 11, 1972, The Grateful Dead performed at Newcastle City Hall as part of their tour of Europe that year. The complete show was released as volume 3 of the Europe '72: The Complete Recordings box set.

The singer-songwriter David Bowie performed in the City Hall in January 1973 during his Ziggy Stardust Tour and the rock band Wishbone Ash recorded tracks at the City Hall for the live album Live Dates in June 1973. Meanwhile, the rock band Roxy Music recorded tracks for Viva Roxy Music at the City Hall in October 1974.

In 1981, rock band Motörhead recorded the majority of the tracks for their live album No Sleep 'til Hammersmith at the City Hall. Later that year rock band Slade performed and recorded their show, which was later released as a live album, entitled Slade on Stage.

The German rock band, Rammstein, played at the city hall in October 1997 and Ray Jackson performed with a new lineup of Lindisfarne in December 2013.

== See also ==
- List of concert halls
