= O2 Academy Glasgow =

Music venue and former cinema in Glasgow

Coordinates: 55.85057°N 4.25912°W

O_{2} Academy Glasgow
- Interactive map of O_{2} Academy Glasgow
- Location: Glasgow
- Owner: Academy Music Group
- Capacity: 2,500
- Events: Rock, Indie music, comedy

Construction
- Opened: 26 March 2003

Website
- www.o2academyglasgow.co.uk

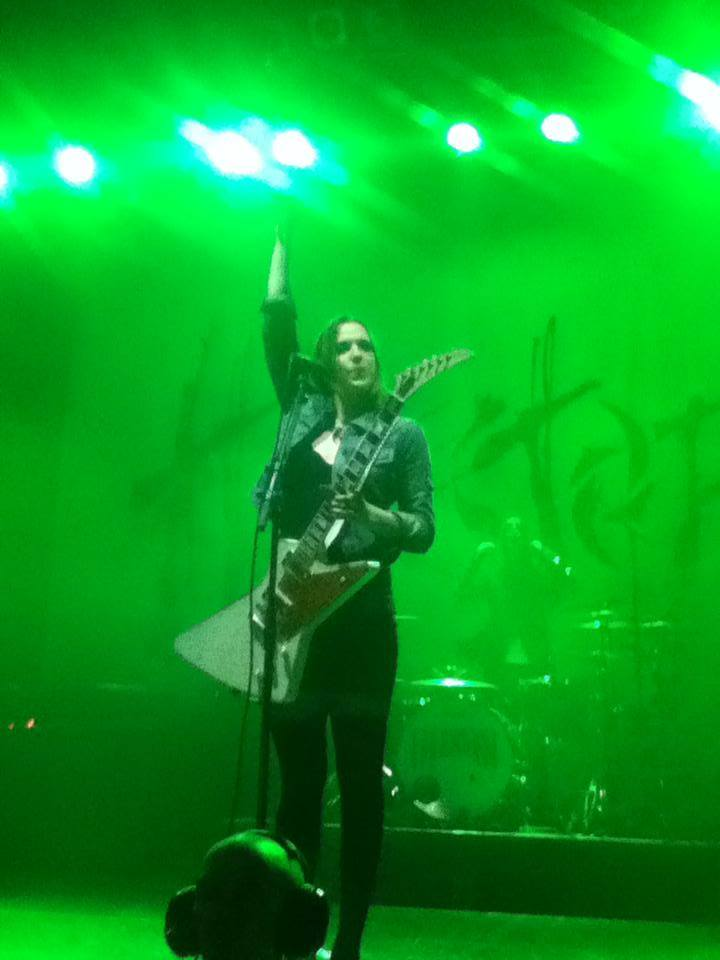
Lzzy Hale with Halestorm performing at the O2 Academy Glasgow.

The O_{2} Academy Glasgow (formerly the Carling Academy Glasgow) is a music venue on Eglinton Street in the Gorbals (Laurieston) area of Glasgow. It holds 2,500 people. It was one of two Academy Music Group venues in Glasgow, until the O_{2} ABC Glasgow closed due to fire damage in 2018.

It was one of a group of music venues in Britain branded Carling Academy, the best known including the Brixton Academy and the O_{2} Academy Birmingham. Since November 2008, the venue has been rebranded by network operator O_{2} to its new name, following a new sponsorship deal with Live Nation.

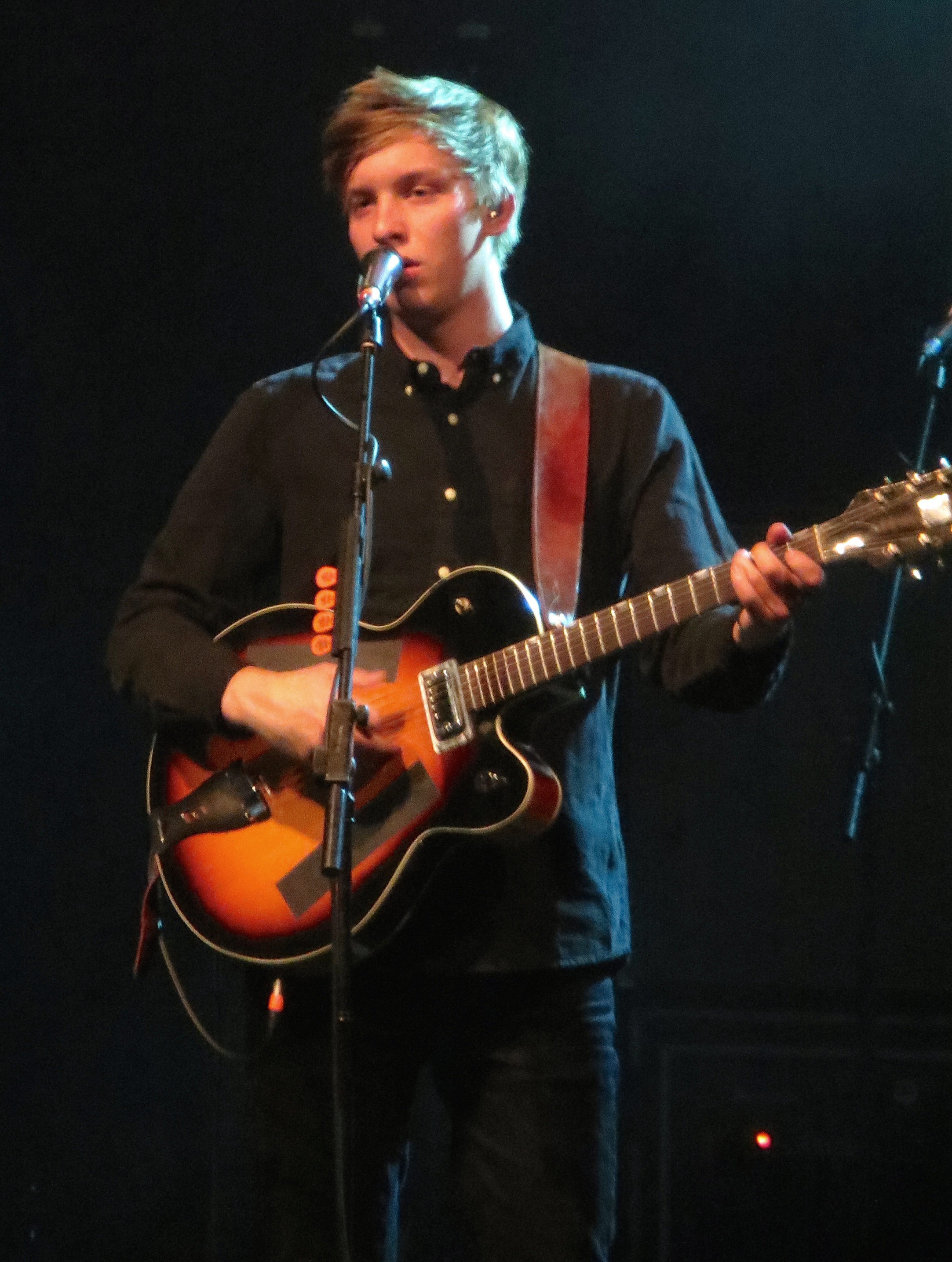
George Ezra playing at the O2 Academy in Glasgow in 2015.

== History ==
The venue is housed in the former New Bedford Cinema which underwent a £3 million refurbishment project to turn it into a 2,500 person music venue. The venue opened on 26 March 2003 with the band Deacon Blue, Singer Bryan Ferry and girl group Sugababes after 10 years of the building being closed and in disrepair.

On 6 November 2008, it was announced that Telefónica Europe (owners of the O_{2} Network in the UK) had become the new sponsor of all Academy venues, in a deal with music promoter Live Nation. The deal, which lasts for five years, sees all venues rebranded "The O_{2} Academy", in line with Telefónica's purchase of the Millennium Dome (now The O2).

== Events ==
- The Killers' 2006 gig at the venue sold out in a record three minutes. This led to the band announcing a date at Glasgow's SECC Arena the following night.
- James Brown played his last UK gig at the venue on 25 October 2006.
- The venue hosted a prestigious O_{2} Wireless Festival workshop on 10 May 2008.
- During the annual Glasgow International Comedy Festival, the venue is transformed into a comedy club with shows taking place every night. Russell Brand, Jimmy Carr and Frankie Boyle have performed at the venue.
- The venue played host to The Gigantour on 19 February 2008.
- Frankie Boyle hosts the record for the most shows played at the venue - a total of 14 - including six during 2008's Glasgow Comedy Festival.
- Olivia Rodrigo has performed here on July 2, 2022, on her Sour Tour.
- AJR performed here on 28 September 2022 on their tour supporting their album "OK Orchestra".
- Fish played his final two shows ever on 9 and 10 March 2025 at the venue.
- Rita Ora Played her first Headline show in 6 years here on the 11th May 2018
- Alessi Rose has played here on 30 November 2025, on her Voyeur Tour
- RuPaul's Drag Race UK Vs The World kicked off their UK Vs the world Tour here on 25 April 2024
