= O2 Academy Bristol =

Music venue in Bristol, England

Coordinates: 51.4542°N 2.6004°W

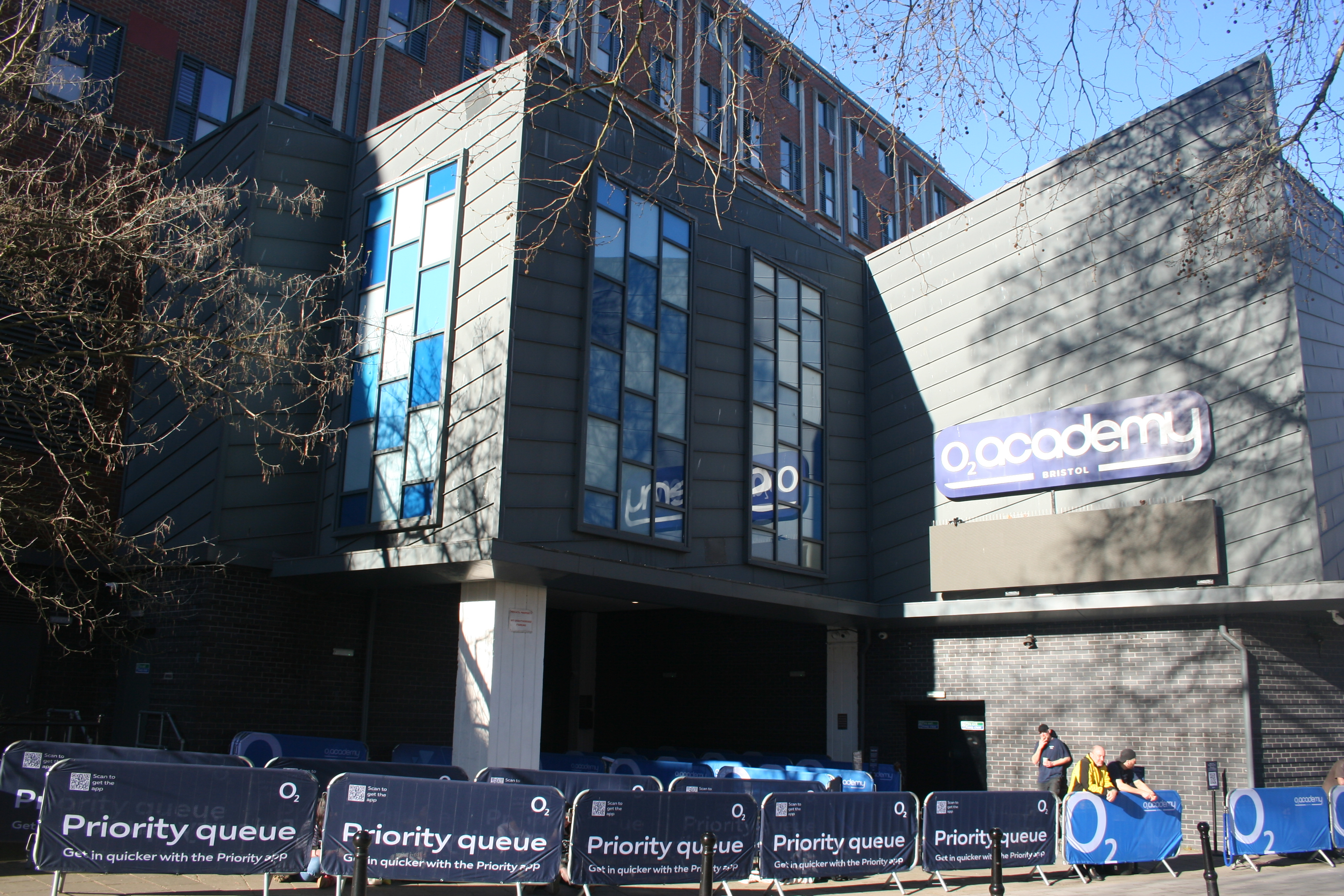
- Exterior of the venue in March 2026
- Interactive map of O2 Academy Bristol
- Former names: Locarno (1966-97); Rock (1999-2001); Carling Academy (2001-08)
- Address: 1-2 Frogmore St; Bristol BS1 5NA England
- Owner: Academy Music Group
- Capacity: 1,600 (Academy 1); 250 (Academy 2)

Construction
- Opened: 17 November 1966
- Closed: 1997–99

Website
- Venue Website

The O2 Academy Bristol (originally known as the Locarno and then Carling Academy Bristol) is a music venue located on Frogmore Street in Bristol, England. It is run by the Academy Music Group. On 1 January 2009 sponsorship was taken over from Carling by telecommunications company O2 and the venue's name changed from the Carling Academy to the O2 Academy. The academy which hosts club nights and gigs was opened in 2001, and was the third Academy venue in the UK.

== History ==
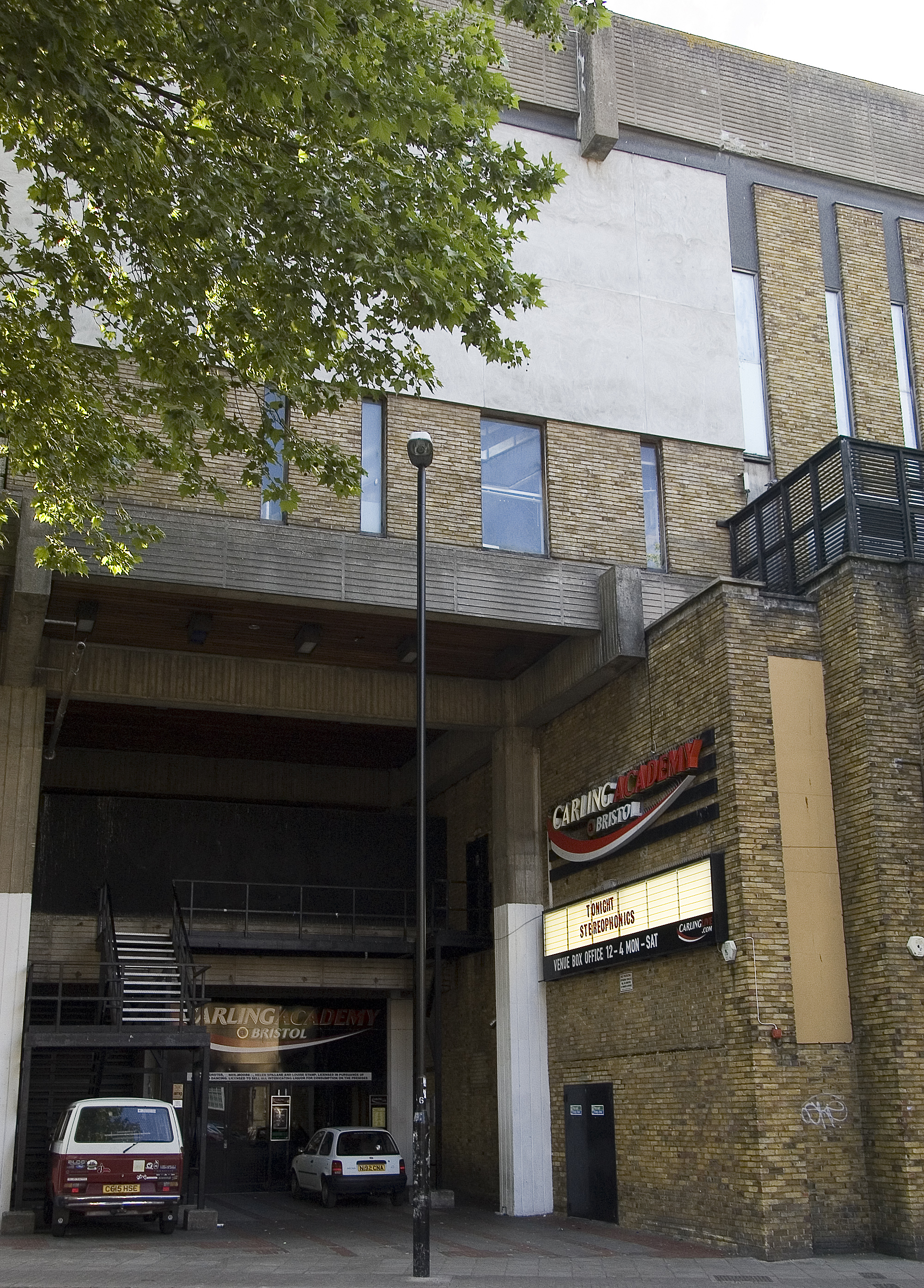
Exterior view of venue under former signage (c.2007)

The venue was originally part of Mecca Leisure Group's New Entertainments Centre and was an ABC Cinema. Opening in 1966, it included: a dozen licensed bars, an ice rink, bowling lanes, the Craywood Club casino, a night club, a grand cinema and the ballroom with an illuminated ceiling. Only the ice-rink and the cinema survived, the rest being demolished in 1998 and subsequently the site given over to student accommodation. The cinema closed in 1996 and was converted into a nightclub in 2000, originally called "Rock". Soon after, it became the "Carling Academy".
