= Academy Music Group =

British music venue operator

Academy Music Group (AMG) is an owner-operator of music venues in the United Kingdom. They operate a number of medium-sized venues, the majority of which (until January 2009) took the name Carling Academy after their sponsor Carling. Some of these also contain smaller venues used for less well known acts; these typically take the title 'Academy 2'.

The group formed a partnership in 2008 with O2 to allow customers of the company to receive priority access to tickets at the venues. The deal saw eleven UK venues renamed O2 Academies from 1 January 2009, with O2 customers able to buy tickets to gigs up to two days before others. The deal also involved music promoter Live Nation who own 51% of the venues. In July 2017, O2, Live Nation and Academy Music Group renewed the agreement for a further ten years till 2027.

== Venues ==
=== Current ===
Venue	Capacity	Location	Source
O2 Academy Birmingham	3,009	Birmingham	
O2 Academy2 Birmingham	600	Birmingham	
O2 Academy3 Birmingham	250	Birmingham	
O2 Academy Bournemouth	1,800	Bournemouth	
O2 Academy Bristol	1,650	Bristol	
O2 Academy2 Bristol	250	Bristol	
O2 Academy Brixton	4,921	London	
O2 Academy Edinburgh	3,000	Edinburgh	
O2 Academy Glasgow	2,550	Glasgow	
O2 Academy Islington	800	London	
O2 Academy2 Islington	250	London	
O2 Academy Leeds	2,300	Leeds	
O2 Academy2 Leeds	400	Leeds	
O2 Academy Leicester	1,450	Leicester	
O2 Academy Liverpool	1,200	Liverpool	
O2 Academy2 Liverpool	500	Liverpool	
O2 Academy Oxford	1,020	Oxford	
O2 Academy2 Oxford	436	Oxford	
O2 Academy Sheffield	2,150	Sheffield	
O2 Academy2 Sheffield	400	Sheffield	
O2 City Hall Newcastle	2,135	Newcastle upon Tyne	
O2 Forum Kentish Town	2,300	London	
O2 Institute Birmingham	1,500	Birmingham	
O2 Ritz Manchester	1,500	Manchester	
O2 Shepherd's Bush Empire	2,000	London	
O2 Victoria Warehouse	3,500	Manchester	

=== Partner venues ===
Venue	Capacity	Location	Source
O2 Guildhall Southampton	1,749	Southampton	
O2 Apollo Manchester	3,500	Manchester	

=== Upcoming ===
Venue	Capacity	Location	Source
Brighton Hippodrome	2,300	Brighton	
Odyssey, Belfast	11,200	Belfast	

=== Former ===
Venue	Capacity	Location	Status
Forum Birmingham	3,500	Birmingham	Formerly O2 Academy Birmingham. No longer operated by AMG.
NX Newcastle	2,000	Newcastle upon Tyne	Formerly O2 Academy Newcastle. No longer operated by AMG.
O2 ABC Glasgow	1,300	Glasgow	Closed due to fire damage
