= O2 ABC Glasgow =

Nightclub and music venue in Glasgow, a former circus and cinema

O_{2} ABC Glasgow
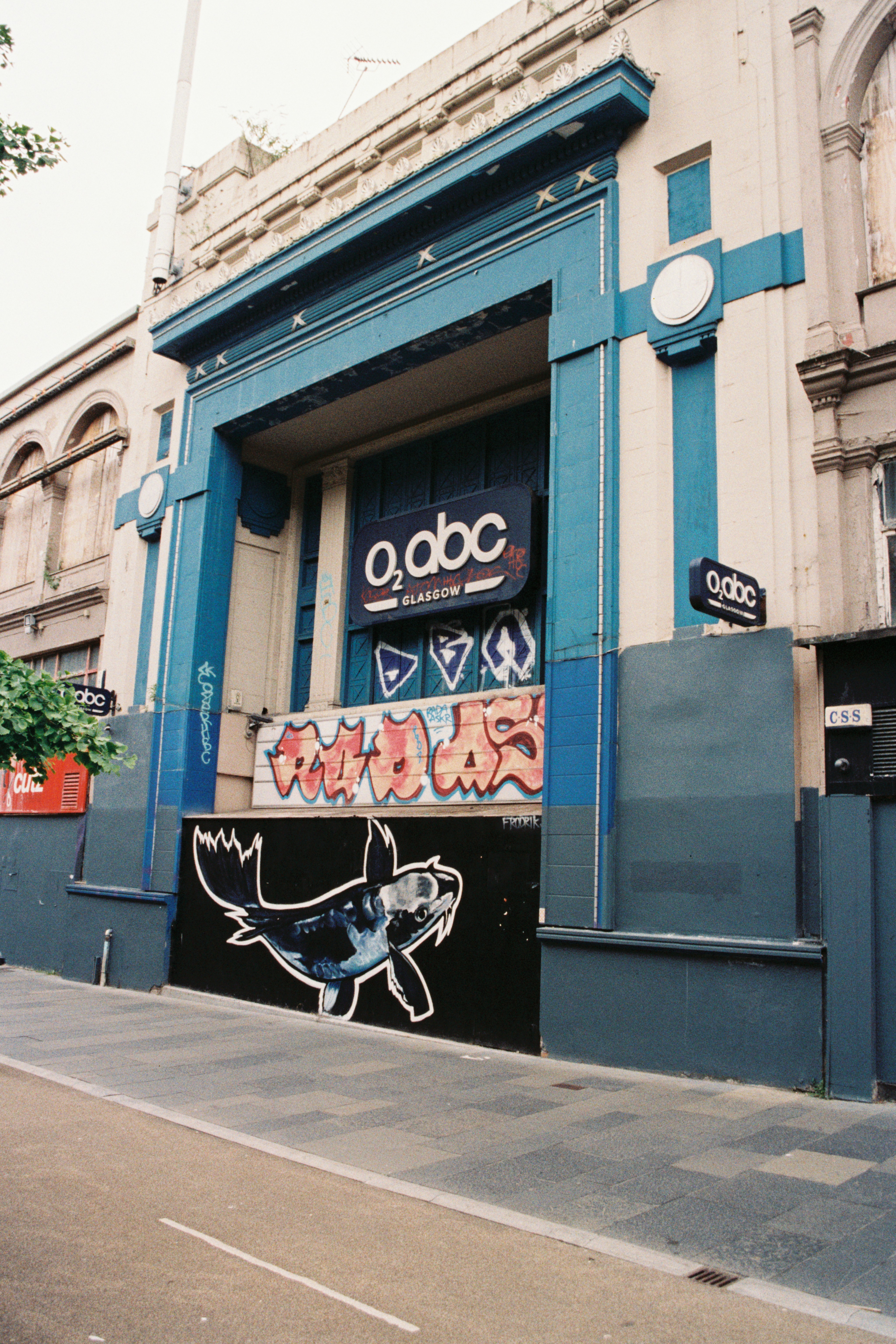
- The ABC before it was demolished
- Interactive map of O_{2} ABC Glasgow
- Former names: Diorama, Panorama, Hubner's Ice-Skating Palace, Hippodrome, Hengler's Circus, Waldorf Palais, Regal Cinema, ABC
- Address: 286-326 Sauchiehall Street, Glasgow, Scotland
- Coordinates: 55.86581°N 4.26405°W
- Owner: Academy Music Group
- Capacity: ABC1: 1,300; ABC2: 350
- Type: Nightclub, music venue
- Events: Rock, Comedy, Dance, House, Indie

Construction
- Built: 1875
- Opened: 2005
- Renovated: 2002–2005, 1887–1889, 1927–1928
- Expanded: 1967
- Closed: 2018

Website
- o2abcglasgow.co.uk

The O_{2} ABC was a nightclub and music venue on Sauchiehall Street, in the centre of Glasgow. The building was constructed in 1875, renovated many times in its lifetime and also largely rebuilt in the 1920s. The building was used for numerous functions before being finally converted to its final purpose between 2002 and 2005, before finally closing in June 2018 after extensive fire damage. In 2009, the Academy Music Group took a majority stake in the venue, rebranding it the O_{2} ABC. The venue was formerly protected as a category C(S) listed building. In March 2009; the Academy Music Group became the major stockholder of the O2 ABC.

On 15 June 2018, the building was severely damaged by a fire outbreak causing the main roof of the venue to collapse. The fire had started in the Mackintosh Building of the nearby Glasgow School of Art which had recently been undergoing construction work due to a fire that occurred on 23 May 2014.

On 7 August 2024, Glasgow council served the building with a notice which stipulates that all unstable sections of the building must be demolished by 9 December 2024.

== History ==
=== Building history ===
In November 1929 ABC opened its flagship cinema. The architect who designed the building was named: CJ McNair. As this was to be ABC's flagship cinema it also seated a total of 2,359 people. The cinema was a conversion from an older building. The building was originally built in 1875 as the Diorama. In 1878 it was renamed as the Panorama. 10 years from the building's creation; in 1885 the building was then completely transformed to become Hubners Ice Skating Palace. In 1888 the building was one of the first in Glasgow to have electricity,

The next phase of the building's life was when it was renamed the Hippodrome. The building became the home of the then popular "Hengler's Circus". When the circus was not putting on shows the building was used once again for the purpose of showing films to the public. In 1927 the building reverted into the function it was originally built for, a dance hall. The building consisted of a ground floor car park while the second floor was the main dance hall.

=== Cinema ===
When the dancehall was renovated in 1929 the building retained the majority of its original architecture. the roof structure, the ground level of the building remained the car park while the dance floor became the stalls of the cinema. The ground level also had a small entrance area that consisted of 2 box-offices. The main entrance of the cinema was reached by the twin staircase; which is still there today, as well as the option of two lifts to use. The actual auditorium; which consisted of seats on ground level and above, with balconies overlooking the stage, seated a total of 2359 people.

In 1967 the building was renamed to "ABC 1" as there was an extension added onto the building which was named "ABC 2"; The ABC 2 housed a much smaller 922 people. The ABC 2 was the first cinema to open in Scotland since World War II had ended. The building also contained a fully licensed bar.

In 1979 the main building (ABC1) closed to undergo a renovation into a four-screen cinema. Each of these screens seated: 906, 306, 206 and 192 people. The renovated building opened its doors to the public on 13 December 1979. The four-screen building closed on 29 October 1998, while the other building closed on 12 October 1999.

=== Music venue ===
David McBride from Regular Music spotted a gap in the market for a music venue of this size in Glasgow. A major interior conversion project of the former ABC1 cinema building was started in 2002 and then in 2005 the fit-out was completed. In 2009, the Academy Music Group took a majority stake in the venue, rebranding it the O2 ABC.

=== Events ===
The building hosted regular events in the form of live music performances and nightclub parties. O2 ABC Glasgow turned into a nightclub venue for three events during the week names; Jellybaby, Propaganda and Love Music.

=== Damage ===
The building was extensively damaged by fire over the night of 15–16 June 2018. The fire spread from the adjacent Glasgow School of Art. A building warrant application was made to Glasgow City Council in February 2019 for demolishing the entire building.

== Venue structure ==
The building comprised two venues, ABC1 and ABC2, and five bars; ABC1, ABC2, The Red Room, The Pod Bar, and The Polar Bar.
