= O2 Academy Bournemouth =

Live entertainment venue in Bournemouth, England

Coordinates: 50.727°N 1.840°W

O_{2} Academy Bournemouth
- Location: 570 Christchurch Rd, Bournemouth, BH1 4BH
- Owner: Academy Music Group
- Opened: September 2009
- Capacity: 1,800
- Website: www.o2academybournemouth.co.uk

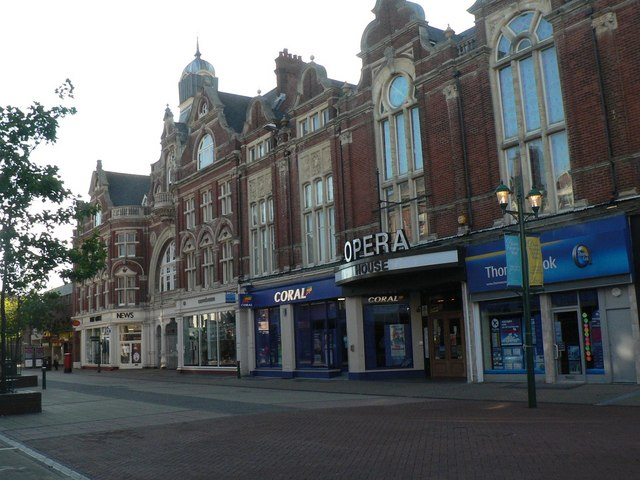
Image of the O2 Academy Bournemouth

O_{2} Academy Bournemouth is a live entertainment venue in Bournemouth, Dorset, England. It is a grade-II listed building.

The building at 568–578 Christchurch Road, Bournemouth, was opened as a theatre on 27 May 1895, named the Grand Pavilion Theatre. Following a change of ownership in 1898, the new proprietors renamed the venue the Boscombe Grand Theatre. In 1905 it was rebranded Boscombe Hippodrome, which it was known as for over 50 years - the longest it held a name - before another name change came in 1956 when the theatre was closed for a refit and reopened as a dance hall called The Royal Ballrooms.

Throughout the 1960s and early 70s, the building was used as a music venue, visited by acts such as Pink Floyd, Status Quo, Led Zeppelin, Thin Lizzy, Hawkwind, The Faces and David Bowie. Some of these biggest names were during the comparatively short period from 1971 to 1972, when the venue hosted club night Starkers.

In December 1972, the venue was turned into a discotheque named Tiffany's, a name it kept for 10 years until 1982 when the building had a multimillion-pound refurbishment and became the Academy Nightclub. The nightclub had one of the first water-cooled lasers and the first Karaoke bar in the UK. Acts included The Sisters of Mercy, Hawkwind, Brand New Heavies, Courtney Pine, JTQ and Frankie Goes to Hollywood. Other acts known to have held concerts at the venue include Deep Purple, Canned Heat, T.Rex, Colosseum, Freedom, Joe Jammer and Slade.

The rise of rave culture in the 1990s spawned nights such as Fantasia, Wild Turkey and Parhelion. In 1997 the venue was renamed once more as the Opera House nightclub, and in the same year the dance night Slinky was launched. In the early 2000s era of superclubs, Slinky became known as one of the best club nights in the country, enjoying many years of success and attracting some of the biggest global names in electronic music including Dav Gomrass, Armin van Buuren, Paul van Dyk, and Paul Oakenfold. Slinky was synonymous with the Opera House until its final event held on 5 October 2013.

The Opera House was closed for a three million-pound refurbishment between November 2006 and June 2007, and officially reopened by Jo Whiley.

The Opera House was sold to AMG Group in July 2009 and rebranded as O2 Academy Bournemouth from September of that year. Under the O2 Academy name - and still known affectionately locally as either the Academy or the Opera House - it now hosts a wide range of live music events alongside the traditional dance music events it became popular for.

Many well-known acts have played the venue since then, including Steve Harley (as a 3-man electro-acoustic set, not with Cockney Rebel) and 2004 triple Brit award winner The Darkness.
