= O2 Academy Liverpool =

Music venue in Liverpool, England

Coordinates: 53.409°N 2.976°W

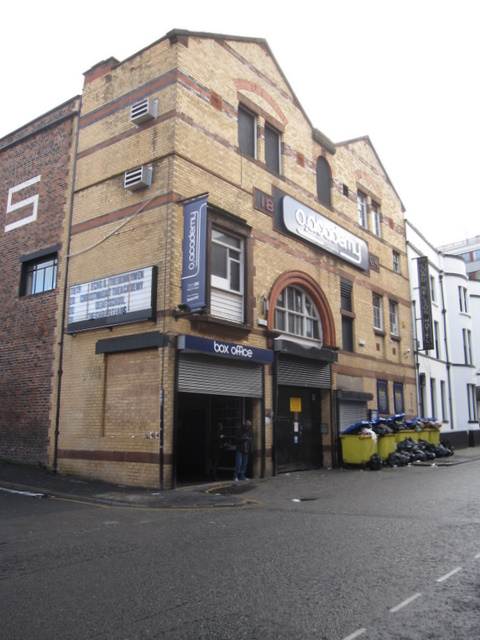

The O_{2} Academy Liverpool (formerly the L2 and Carling Academy Liverpool) is a music venue in Hotham Street, Liverpool, England, that is run by the Academy Music Group.

The building is a 19th-century warehouse that was converted into a music venue in 2000. It closed in 2002 and then reopened after refurbishment in September 2003.

The main building consists of performance areas. O_{2} Academy1 can hold 1,200 (900-floor/300 balcony) people while O_{2} Academy2 can hold 500. There are also 5 bars in the building which cater for the visitors who come to see shows (two in O_{2} Academy2 and three in O_{2}Academy1.

On 6 November 2008 it was announced that Telefónica Europe (owners of the O_{2} Network in the UK) had become the new sponsor of all Academy venues, in a deal with music promoter Live Nation Entertainment. The deal, which lasts for five years, sees all venues rebranded "The O_{2} Academy", in line with Telefónica's purchase of naming rights to the Millennium Dome (now The O_{2}).
