= O2 Academy Leicester =

Music venue in Leicester, England

- Interactive map of O2 Academy Leicester
- Location: Leicester, England, United Kingdom
- Coordinates: 52.6217°N 1.12527°W
- Owner: Academy Music Group
- Capacity: 1,450 (Academy1); 500 (Academy2); 250 (Academy3)
- Type: Live music, nightclub
- Event: All

Construction
- Opened: 2010

Website
- https://www.o2academyleicester.co.uk/

The O2 Academy Leicester is a music venue located in the English City of Leicester on the University of Leicester campus.

O2 Academy Leicester is the second largest purpose built live music venue in the city with a 1,450 Capacity. In addition there is one additional venue on site operating independently and simultaneously: O2 Academy2 Leicester with a 500 capacity.

The venue provides live music and club events, including student nights for The University of Leicester.
