= O2 Academy Islington =

Music venue in London, England

Coordinates: 51.5345°N 0.1058°W

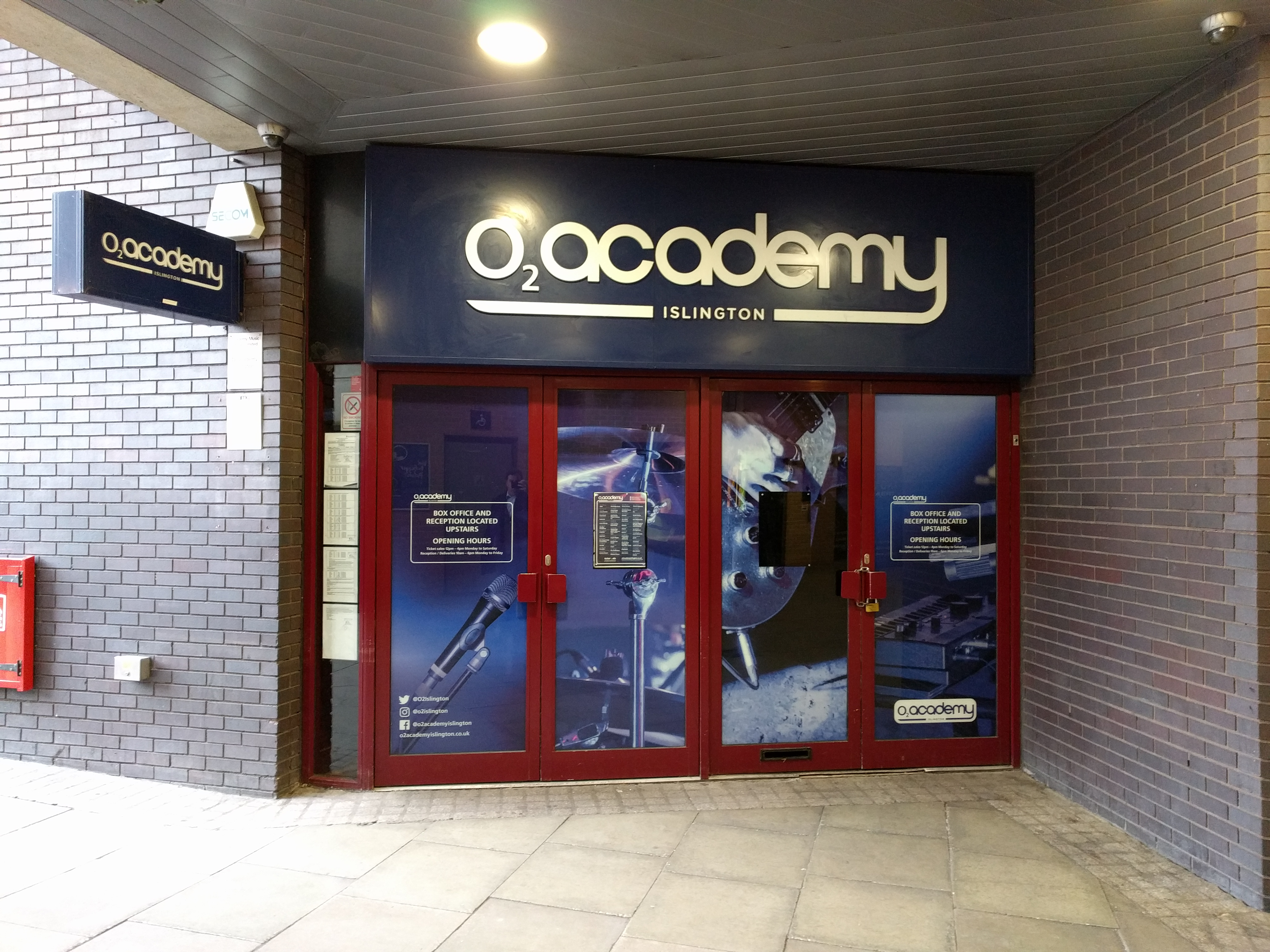
O_{2} Academy

The O_{2} Academy Islington, formerly known as the Carling Academy Islington, is an indoor music venue situated in the N1 Shopping Centre accessible via Upper Street and Liverpool Road, in the London Borough of Islington. It is run by the Academy Music Group. The main venue has a capacity of 800, and the adjacent O_{2} Academy 2 holds 250.

== History ==
The venue was purpose-built and opened in September 2002. The original occupant was the short-lived Marquee N1, a music and dining venue backed by Dave Stewart of Eurythmics and club promoter Mark Fuller.

The venue re-opened in its current form in September 2003 and is the smallest of the four London venues within the O2 Academy Group.

== Performers ==
American punks Alkaline Trio performed on the venue's opening night.

Other notable performers who have played at the O2 Academy Islington include MELYS, Iron Butterfly, Molly Hatchet, Tesla, Dan Reed Network, Night Ranger, Isolated Islands, Bladee, Blackfoot, Queensrÿche, Kiss, Kamelot, KSI, Spock's Beard, Stratovarius, Terrorvision, Stryper, Winger, Paul Gilbert, Richie Kotzen, Steve Lukather, Steve Harley and Cockney Rebel The Winery Dogs, Diamond Head, Premiata Forneria Marconi, Edguy, Symphony X, Threshold, Big Country, Magnum, The Mission, Riverside, Satyricon, FM, Train, The Damned, MaNga, Melanie C, Zebrahead, Funeral for a Friend, Hugh Cornwell, Tarja Turunen, Jello Biafra, Gackt, Girugamesh, Hikaru Utada, The Jon Spencer Blues Explosion, Coheed and Cambria, VAMPS, August Burns Red, Max Milner, The Script, The Rasmus, Tyler, The Creator, Fall Out Boy, Silversun Pickups, Yeah Yeah Yeahs, Paramore, East 17, Morbid Angel, Sanguisugabogg, Dimmu Borgir, Sarah Harding, Tokio Hotel, R5, My Chemical Romance (who recorded the music video for their single Planetary (Go!) there), The Rutles, Stephen Dale Petit, Matt Stevens, Mick Taylor, JoJo, James Maslow, Achilles Heel, Toploader, Roger Chapman, Road Trip, Rolling Quartz, and The Airborne Toxic Event.

In May and June 2008, Sparks, led by brothers Ron and Russell Mael, held a unique event at the Carling Academy. To promote their then-new album Exotic Creatures of the Deep, the band performed all twenty of their previous albums in chronological order, across as many nights. The album premiere itself took place immediately afterwards at the Shepherd’s Bush Empire on 13 June 2008.

== Events ==
The Academy also hosts the weekly club nights Club de Fromage and not another indie Disco every Saturday.
