= NX Newcastle =

Music venue in Newcastle upon Tyne, England

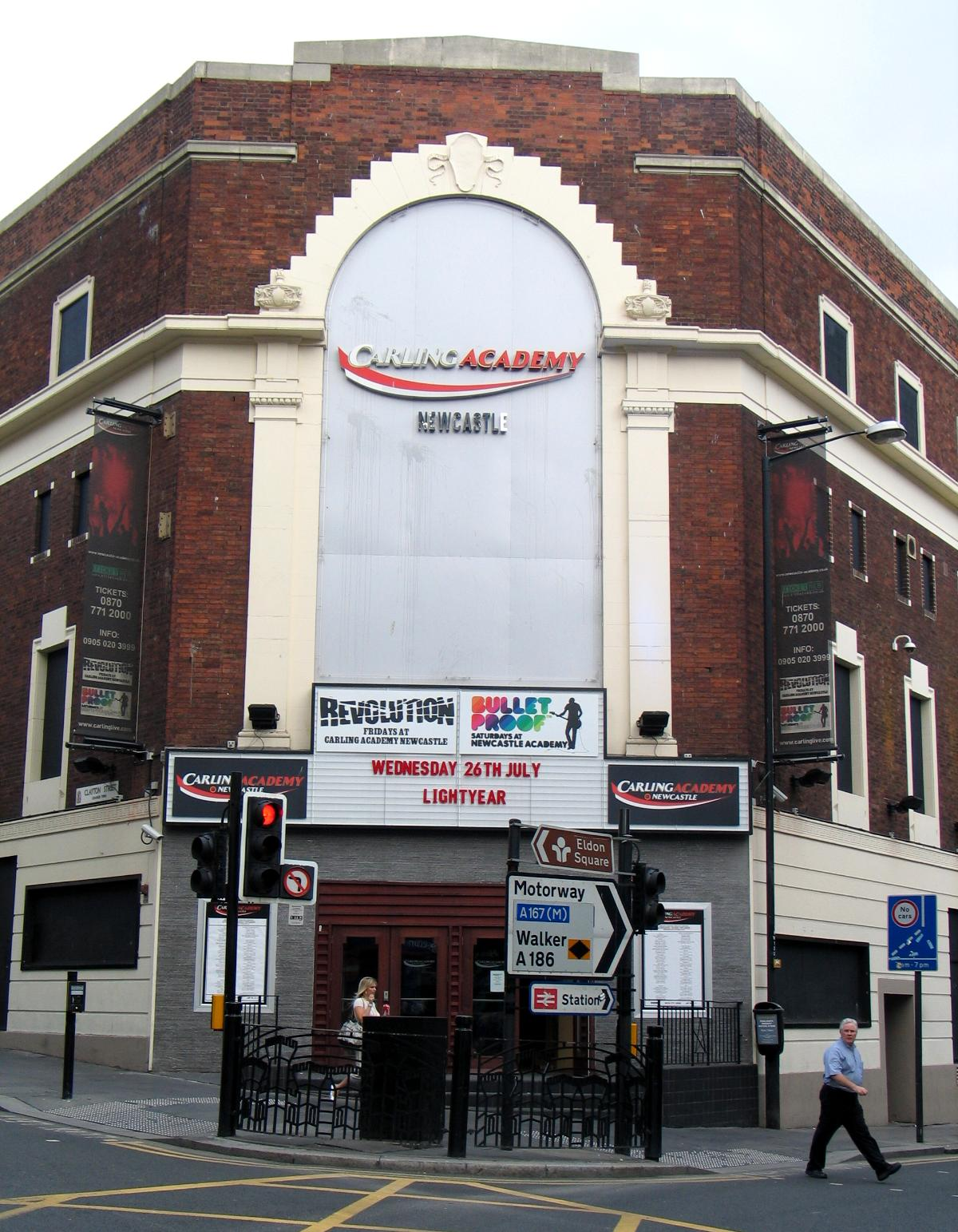
- The venue during its time as the Carling Academy in 2006
- Interactive map of NX Newcastle
- Former names: Carling Academy Newcastle; O_{2} Academy Newcastle
- Address: Westgate Road, Newcastle upon Tyne, Tyne and Wear, NE1 1SW; United Kingdom
- Location: Newcastle upon Tyne, England
- Coordinates: 54.970411°N 1.6185073°W
- Operator: Electric Group
- Capacity: 2,000
- Type: Music venue

Construction
- Opened: October 1927 (as a cinema); 1959 (as Majestic Ballroom); 14 October 2005 (as O_{2} Academy Newcastle); September 2022 (as current venue)

Website
- www.nxnewcastle.com

NX Newcastle, formerly known as the Carling Academy and the O_{2} Academy Newcastle, is a music venue in Newcastle upon Tyne, England. It opened in the former Majestic Ballroom building on 14 October 2005 as the Carling Academy, and was renamed the O_{2} Academy for sponsorship reasons in 2008. The venue was managed by Academy Music Group until early 2022, when Electric Group took over the operation of the site. Following a complete refurbishment, it reopened as NX Newcastle in September 2022.

The O_{2} Academy had two rooms and could host up to 2,000 people for a show. Major bands and solo musicians that have performed in the main room since 2005 include Arctic Monkeys, Adele, Katy Perry, The Libertines, Sam Smith, McFly, Blondie, Pierce the Veil and Amy Winehouse. The upstairs room, formerly known as O_{2} Academy2, is smaller and hosts performances by lesser-known bands. The venue has also hosted club nights, including Dirty Pop, Ikon Live and Alpha.

== History ==
=== Early history ===
Located on Westgate Road and Clayton Street, the building first opened in 1927 as the 1,870-seat New Westgate Picture House, showing its first movie – the silent film The Monkey Talks – in October of that year. In 1959 the venue was renamed the Majestic Ballroom, and hosted performances by The Beatles and The Who in the 1960s. It was then a Gala Bingo hall for over twenty-five years until the chain relocated the club to Byker.

=== As an Academy venue ===
Academy Music Group first declared their interest in taking over the building from Newcastle City Council at the end of 2004, and an entertainment licence was granted in March 2005 despite protests from local residents concerned about the noise and anti-social behaviour. The official acquisition was announced the following month, with the venue confirmed as the latest member of the Carling Academy chain of venues.

The Carling Academy opened on 14 October 2005 with a headline performance by Sunderland band The Futureheads and support slots from Kubichek! and Field Music. The opening of the venue was called the "biggest happening on the Newcastle music scene in a decade". In November an Ian Brown concert was cut short after the floor of the venue started to sag, requiring the venue to close for a short time. Newcastle's Maxïmo Park played at the new venue in December, shortly after their international breakthrough with debut album A Certain Trigger. Other performers in the opening months included Natalie Imbruglia, The Human League and Rooster.

In 2006 the Carling Academy was one of the venues for Evolution Festival for the first time, hosting performances by Hot Chip and The Guillemots. The NME Awards Tour, featuring Arctic Monkeys, We Are Scientists, Mystery Jets and Maxïmo Park, also stopped by for the first time in January. Panic! At the Disco headlined at the academy in April 2006, and The Killers in November. In 2007 Mika performed at the height of his fame, filling the venue with giant balloons, while Amy Winehouse was an hour late for her headline performance in the same year.

All of the Carling Academy venues were re-branded under the O_{2} Academy name in 2008 through a £22.5 million deal with Telefónica Europe's O_{2} mobile network brand. Blur played a surprise show at the O_{2} Academy in 2009, their first appearance in Newcastle for twelve years. Katy Perry performed at the venue on her Hello Katy Tour in August 2009, and Adele made a much-hyped appearance in 2011. The popular alternative night Alpha moved to the O_{2} Academy in February 2014.

On 14 October 2015 the O_{2} Academy celebrated its tenth birthday with a ten-band bill of local talents, headlined by the popular Little Comets. Years & Years, The Prodigy, The 1975 and James Bay also sold out the venue in the surrounding months.

=== As NX Newcastle ===
The freehold of the venue was put up for sale by Newcastle City Council in 2015 for £625,000, with reassurances that the operation of the venue would not be affected. It was purchased by Electric Group, who run the Electric Brixton and SWX Bristol venues. Academy Group's lease on the building expired in March 2021. In 2020, planning documents were submitted to Newcastle City Council by Electric for "a significant scheme of renovation and improvements before reopening as Newcastle's premier live music venue" in Autumn 2022 as NX Newcastle.
