= O2 Academy Sheffield =

Live music venue in Sheffield, England

Coordinates: 53.3820°N 1.4655°W

O_{2} Academy Sheffield
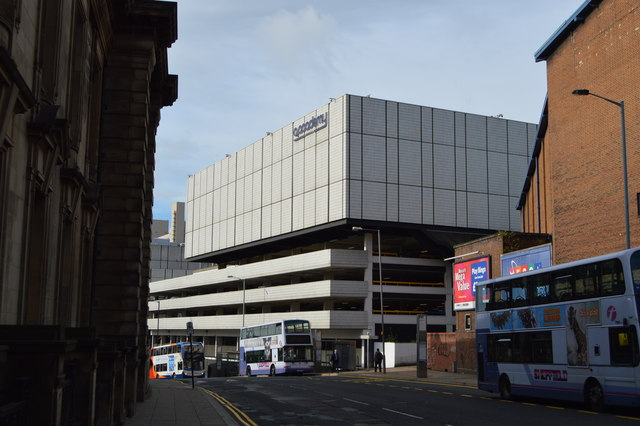
- Interactive map of O_{2} Academy Sheffield
- Location: Sheffield, South Yorkshire, England
- Owner: Academy Music Group
- Capacity: 2,150
- Events: Rock, comedy
- Public transit: B P Y TT; Castle Square; Arundel Gate Interchange

Construction
- Opened: 2008

Website
- www.o2academysheffield.co.uk

The O_{2} Academy Sheffield (formerly the Carling Academy Sheffield) is a temporarily closed live music venue in the centre of Sheffield, South Yorkshire. It is a £3 million refurbishment of the former "Roxy Nightclub" (originally the "Top Rank Suite" opened in 1968, becoming The Roxy in 1985) and opened on 11 April 2008.

The O_{2} Academy closed in September 2023 due to concerns relating to reinforced autoclaved aerated concrete used in the construction of the venue, following a wider nationwide crisis. Following a refurbishment to replace the defective concrete, the venue is scheduled to reopen in February 2027.

== History ==
In 2007 the Academy Music Group announced that it had acquired the former Roxy Disco nightclub and was to transform it into the Carling Academy Sheffield. The conversion of the venue was subject to some opposition from rival nightclubs in the area on the grounds of crime and disorder.

The venue opened on 11 April 2008, with Reverend and the Makers playing on the opening night. On 6 November 2008, it was announced that Telefónica Europe (owners of the O_{2} Network in the UK) had become the new sponsor of all Academy venues, in a deal with music promoter Live Nation. The deal, which lasts for five years, sees all venues rebranded "The O_{2} Academy", in line with Telefónica's purchase of the Millennium Dome (now The O_{2}).

Reverend & The Makers' second live album, Reverend and The Makers Live in Sheffield, was recorded at the venue and released in December 2012.

The venue was temporarily closed in September 2023 due to safety concerns relating to the used of reinforced autoclaved aerated concrete in the construction of the venue. On 10 February 2025 planning permission was granted to replace the roof by Sheffield City Council, with a view to then reopening the venue. The venue is currently expected to reopen in February 2027.

== Structure ==
There are two separate performance areas for both live music and smaller club events.

=== O_{2} Academy Sheffield ===
The O_{2} Academy Sheffield includes "a large main auditorium with a capacity of 2,350 and a secondary smaller room, emulating the success of its multi-room format at other AMG venues across the country, to hold 600." It will aim to attract British and international touring artists in the same way that AMG's other venues do.

=== O_{2} Academy Sheffield 2 ===
The O_{2} Academy Sheffield 2 is capable of hosting smaller, up and coming artists or other small-scale events. The capacity for this room is 500.
