= Appeal To Reason Tour =

2008–10 concert tour by Rise Against

Appeal to Reason Tour
- World tour by Rise Against
- Promotional poster for the tour
- Associated album: Appeal to Reason
- Start date: June 13, 2008 (Pre-release tour); October 2, 2008 (Official promotional tour)
- End date: July 11, 2010
- Legs: 9 (2 pre-release legs)

Rise Against concert chronology
- The Sufferer & the Witness Tour (2006–2007); Appeal to Reason Tour (2008–2010); Endgame Tour (2011–2013)

The Appeal to Reason Tour was a concert tour by American punk band Rise Against, taking place between 2008 and 2010, in support of their fifth studio album Appeal to Reason (2008).

The tour began with a series of summer pre-release shows, including European festival appearances and a few North American Vans Warped Tour dates. Those shows were performed as the band finished the recording of the album. The main supporting tour began in early October with the release of the album.

In the first official leg in the promotion of the Appeal to Reason album, the band was supported by Alkaline Trio, Thrice and The Gaslight Anthem through all the US (with some Canadian dates), this was followed by a series of Canadian dates in December, supported by Thursday and Sage Francis. The band then embarked on an Australian leg in the beginning of 2009, followed by a European leg, which was supported by Strike Anywhere and Rentokill, with all UK dates supported by Anti-Flag and Flobots (except the two last ones, where The King Blues replaced Anti-Flag). The band then returned to Australia, supported by The (International) Noise Conspiracy, and then embarked on a short Japanese tour, with a full-length North American summer tour. The first of it was supported by Rancid and Riverboat Gamblers, with the second part supported by Billy Talent and Rancid. The band then returned for another European leg, playing mainly festivals in the summer, with a winter headlining leg, supported by Thursday and Poison the Well.

== Set list ==
2008
- "Drones"
- "State of the Union"
- "Give It All"
- "Re-Education (Through Labor)"
- "Injection"
- "Ready to Fall"
- "Broken English" / "Everchanging" (Varied between shows)
- "Bricks" / "Halfway There" / "Heaven Knows" (Varied between shows)
- "Collapse (Post-Amerika)"
- "Behind Closed Doors"
- "Life Less Frightening"
- "Chamber the Cartridge"
- "Like the Angel"
- "Blood to Bleed" (Not played on every date)
- "The Good Left Undone"

Acoustic set

- "Hero of War"
- "Swing Life Away"

Encore

- "Survive"
- "Under the Knife" / "Minor Threat" (Minor Threat cover) / "Audience of One" (Varied between shows)
- "Prayer of the Refugee"
2009
- "Collapse (Post-Amerika)"
- "State of the Union"
- "Re-Education (Through Labor)"
- "Paper Wings"
- "Long Forgotten Sons"
- "The Good Left Undone"
- "Chamber the Cartridge"
- "Drones"
- "The Dirt Whispered"
- "Audience of One"
- "Blood to Bleed"
- "Savior"
- "Survive"
- "Torches" / "Alive and Well" / "Blood-Red, White, and Blue" / "Dead Ringer" (Varied between shows)
- "Prayer of the Refugee"

Acoustic set

- "Everchanging" / "Swing Life Away" (Varied between shows)
- "Hero of War"

Encore

- "Dancing for Rain"
- "Give It All"
- "Ready to Fall"
2010
- "Collapse (Post-Amerika)"
- "State of the Union"
- "Re-Education (Through Labor)"
- "Long Forgotten Sons"
- "Injection"
- "The Good Left Undone"
- "Chamber the Cartridge"
- "Drones"
- "The Dirt Whispered"
- "Audience of One"
- "From Heads Unworthy"
- "Savior"
- "Survive"
- "Blood-Red, White, and Blue"
- "Prayer of the Refugee"

Acoustic set

- "Swing Life Away"
- "Hero of War"

Encore

- "Behind Closed Doors" (Not played on every date)
- "Entertainment"
- "Give It All"
- "Ready to Fall"

== Tour dates ==
Date	City	Country	Venue
Europe, Pre-release Leg
June 13, 2008	Donington	England	Download Festival
June 14, 2008	Interlaken	Switzerland	Greenfield Festival
June 15, 2008	Nickelsdorf	Austria	Nova Rock Festival
June 16, 2008	Milan	Italy	Rock the Week Festival
June 18, 2008	Bologna	Italy	Rock the Week Festival
June 20, 2008	Groningen	Netherlands	De Oosterpoort
June 21, 2008	Scheeßel	Germany	Hurricane Festival
June 22, 2008	Tuttlingen	Germany	Southside Festival
North America, Pre-release LegAs part of the Vans Warped Tour 2008
August 6, 2008	Calgary	Canada	Race City Speedway
August 8, 2008	Boise	United States	Idaho Center
August 9, 2008	George	United States	The Gorge Amphitheatre
August 10, 2008	St. Helens	United States	Columbia Meadows
August 13, 2008	Fresno	United States	Save Mart Center at Fresno State
August 14, 2008	Chula Vista	United States	Cricket Wireless Amphitheatre
August 15, 2008	Mountain View	United States	Shoreline Amphitheatre
August 16, 2008	Wheatland	United States	Sleep Train Amphitheatre
August 17, 2008	Carson	United States	The Home Depot Center
September 27, 2008	Queen Creek	United States	Edgefest
North America, Leg #1
October 2, 2008	Cleveland	United States	Time Warner Cable Amphitheater
October 3, 2008	Toronto	Canada	Sound Academy
October 4, 2008	Toronto	Canada	Sound Academy
October 6, 2008	Worcester	United States	The Palladium
October 7, 2008	Norwood	United States	Newbury Comics
October 8, 2008	Wallingford	United States	Chevrolet Theatre
October 9, 2008	Albany	United States	Washington Avenue Armory
October 11, 2008	Hampton Beach	United States	Hampton Beach Casino Ballroom
October 12, 2008	Baltimore	United States	Rams Head Live!
October 13, 2008	New York City	United States	Roseland Ballroom
October 14, 2008	New York City	United States	Roseland Ballroom
October 16, 2008	Philadelphia	United States	Electric Factory
October 17, 2008	Philadelphia	United States	Electric Factory
October 19, 2008	North Myrtle Beach	United States	House of Blues
October 20, 2008	Atlanta	United States	Tabernacle
October 21, 2008	St. Petersburg	United States	Jannus Landing
October 22, 2008	Pompano Beach	United States	Pompano Beach Amphitheatre
October 23, 2008	Orlando	United States	House of Blues
October 25, 2008	Frisco	United States	Pizza Hut Park
~~October 26, 2008~~	~~Austin~~	United States	~~Austin City Music Hall~~
~~October 27, 2008~~	~~Houston~~	United States	~~Verizon Wireless Theater~~
October 30, 2008	San Diego	United States	Cox Arena at Aztec Bowl
October 31, 2008	Los Angeles	United States	Hollywood Palladium
November 1, 2008	Los Angeles	United States	Hollywood Palladium
November 2, 2008	Los Angeles	United States	Hollywood Palladium
November 4, 2008	Las Vegas	United States	House of Blues
November 5, 2008	Las Vegas	United States	House of Blues
November 7, 2008	San Jose	United States	The Event Center Arena
November 8, 2008	Portland	United States	Roseland Theatre
November 9, 2008	Vancouver	Canada	Thunderbird Stadium
November 11, 2008	Salt Lake City	United States	The Great Salt Air Theatre
November 12, 2008	Denver	United States	Fillmore Auditorium
November 13, 2008	Denver	United States	Fillmore Auditorium
November 14, 2008	Kansas City	United States	Uptown Theater
November 16, 2008	St. Louis	United States	The Pageant
November 17, 2008	Milwaukee	United States	Eagles Club
November 18, 2008	Minneapolis	United States	The Myth
November 20, 2008	Chicago	United States	Congress Theater
November 21, 2008	Chicago	United States	Congress Theater
November 22, 2008	Grand Rapids	United States	Orbit Room
November 23, 2008	Detroit	United States	The Fillmore Detroit
November 30, 2008	Saskatoon	Canada	Prairieland Park
December 1, 2008	Regina	Canada	Conexus Arts Centre
December 2, 2008	Calgary	Canada	The Round Up Centre
December 3, 2008	Edmonton	Canada	Shaw Conference Centre
December 5, 2008	Winnipeg	Canada	MTS Centre
December 8, 2008	London	Canada	John Labatt Centre
December 9, 2008	Hamilton	Canada	Wentworth Room
December 10, 2008	Ottawa	Canada	Ottawa Civic Centre
December 11, 2008	Montreal	Canada	CEPSUM Stadium
December 13, 2008	Los Angeles	United States	KROQ Almost Acoustic Christmas
Europe, Leg #1
February 3, 2009	Vienna	Austria	Gasometer
~~February 4, 2009~~	~~Munich~~	Germany	~~Postpalast Muchen~~
February 6, 2009	Leipzig	Germany	Haus Auensee
February 7, 2009	Berlin	Germany	Columbiahalle
February 8, 2009	Bielefeld	Germany	Ringlokschuppen
February 9, 2009	Cologne	Germany	Cologne Palladium
February 11, 2009	Saarbrücken	Germany	Mechanische Werkstatt
February 12, 2009	Wiesbaden	Germany	Schlachthof
February 13, 2009	Hamburg	Germany	Docks
February 14, 2009	Amsterdam	Netherlands	Melkweg
February 16, 2009	Brussels	Belgium	Ancienne Belgique
February 17, 2009	Paris	France	Le Trabendo
February 19, 2009	Dublin	Ireland	The Academy
February 21, 2009	Portsmouth	England	Portsmouth Pyramids Centre
February 22, 2009	Bristol	England	O_{2} Academy Bristol
February 23, 2009	Liverpool	England	O_{2} Academy Liverpool
February 24, 2009	Leeds	England	Leeds Metropolitan University
February 26, 2009	Birmingham	England	O_{2} Academy Birmingham
February 27, 2009	Manchester	England	Manchester Academy
February 28, 2009	Sheffield	England	O_{2} Academy Sheffield
March 1, 2009	Glasgow	Scotland	O_{2} ABC Glasgow
~~March 2, 2009~~	~~Newcastle upon Tyne~~	England	~~Newcastle University~~
March 4, 2009	Norwich	England	University of East Anglia
March 5, 2009	Oxford	England	O_{2} Academy Oxford
March 6, 2009	London	England	The Roundhouse
Oceania, Leg #1
March 24, 2009	Perth	Australia	Metro City
March 25, 2009	Adelaide	Australia	Thebarton Theatre
March 27, 2009	Melbourne	Australia	Festival Hall
March 28, 2009	Sydney	Australia	Hordern Pavilion
March 29, 2009	Brisbane	Australia	Tivoli Theatre
March 31, 2009	Auckland	New Zealand	Powerstation
Asia, Leg #1
April 3, 2009	Osaka	Japan	Zepp
April 4, 2009	Nagoya	Japan	Zepp
April 5, 2009	Tokyo	Japan	PunkSpring Festival
Hawaii & Belgium (Special dates)
April 10, 2009	Honolulu	United States	Pipeline Cafe
April 18, 2009	Meerhout	Belgium	Groezrock
North America, Leg #2
May 1, 2009	Memphis	United States	Beale Street Music Festival
May 3, 2009	East Rutherford	United States	The Bamboozle
June 4, 2009	Vancouver	Canada	Pacific Coliseum
June 6, 2009	Edmonton	Canada	Rexall Place
June 7, 2009	Calgary	Canada	Stampede Corral
June 8, 2009	Saskatoon	Canada	Prairieland Park
June 11, 2009	Morrison	United States	Red Rocks Amphitheatre
June 12, 2009	Kansas City	United States	Uptown Theater
June 13, 2009	St. Louis	United States	Pop's
June 15, 2009	Cleveland	United States	Time Warner Cable Amphitheater
June 17, 2009	Quebec City	Canada	Agora du Vieux-Port
June 18, 2009	Montreal	Canada	Parc Jean-Drapeau
June 19, 2009	Ottawa	Canada	Ottawa Civic Centre
June 21, 2009	Toronto	Canada	MuchMusic Video Awards
June 22, 2009	Cincinnati	United States	Riverbend Music Center
June 24, 2009	Detroit	United States	The Fillmore Detroit
June 25, 2009	Milwaukee	United States	Summerfest
June 26, 2009	Minneapolis	United States	The Myth
June 27, 2009	Winnipeg	Canada	Rock on the Range Canada
July 6, 2009	Seattle	United States	WAMU Theater
July 8, 2009	Reno	United States	Reno Events Center
July 9, 2009	Oakland	United States	Oracle Arena
July 10, 2009	Chula Vista	United States	Cricket Wireless Amphitheater
July 11, 2009	Inglewood	United States	The Forum
July 13, 2009	Paradise	United States	The Joint
July 14, 2009	Mesa	United States	Mesa Arts Center
July 16, 2009	Dallas	United States	Palladium Ballroom
July 17, 2009	Austin	United States	Stubb's Waller Creek Amphitheater
July 18, 2009	Houston	United States	Verizon Wireless Theater
July 20, 2009	Orlando	United States	House of Blues
July 21, 2009	Orlando	United States	House of Blues
July 23, 2009	North Myrtle Beach	United States	House of Blues
July 24, 2009	Baltimore	United States	Rams Head Live!
July 25, 2009	Philadelphia	United States	Festival Pier at Penn's Landing
July 26, 2009	New York City	United States	Roseland Ballroom
July 28, 2009	Boston	United States	House of Blues
July 29, 2009	Boston	United States	House of Blues
July 30, 2009	Hamburg	United States	Agri Center at America's Fairgrounds
July 31, 2009	Toronto	Canada	Molson Amphitheatre
August 8, 2009	Chicago	United States	Lollapalooza
Europe, Leg #2
August 12, 2009	Oslo	Norway	Øyafestivalen
August 13, 2009	Gothenburg	Sweden	Way Out West Festival
August 14, 2009	Saarbrücken	Germany	Rocco Del Schlacko Festival
August 15, 2009	Neu-Ulm	Germany	Wiley Open Air
August 17, 2009	Warsaw	Poland	Club Proxima
August 20, 2009	Salzburg	Austria	FM4 Frequency Festival
August 21, 2009	Munich	Germany	Zenith
August 22, 2009	Lüdinghausen	Germany	Area 4 Festival
August 23, 2009	Hohenfelden	Germany	Highfield Festival
August 26, 2009	Belfast	Northern Ireland	belFEST
August 28, 2009	Reading	England	Reading Festival
August 29, 2009	Leeds	England	Leeds Festival
August 30, 2009	Hamburg	Germany	T-Mobile Festival
United States (Special dates)
September 6, 2009	Los Angeles	United States	Warped Tour 15th Anniversary Celebration
October 3, 2009	Tucson	United States	KFMA Fall Ball
Europe, Leg #3
October 23, 2009	Saint Petersburg	Russia	GlavClub
October 25, 2009	Moscow	Russia	B1 Maximum Club
October 27, 2009	Helsinki	Finland	Kaapelitehdas
October 28, 2009	Tallinn	Estonia	Tallinn Rock Club
October 30, 2009	Stockholm	Sweden	Fryshuset
October 31, 2009	Copenhagen	Denmark	Lille Vega
November 2, 2009	Zürich	Switzerland	X-tra
November 3, 2009	Milan	Italy	Musicdrome
November 4, 2009	Bologna	Italy	Estragon
November 6, 2009	Prague	Czech Republic	Roxy
November 7, 2009	Erfurt	Germany	Thüringenhalle
November 8, 2009	Offenbach	Germany	Offenbach Stadthalle
November 10, 2009	Düsseldorf	Germany	Philipshalle
November 11, 2009	Bremen	Germany	Pier 2
November 13, 2009	Barcelona	Spain	Razzmatazz
November 14, 2009	Madrid	Spain	La Riviera
November 17, 2009	Glasgow	Scotland	Barrowland Ballroom
November 18, 2009	Newcastle upon Tyne	England	O_{2} Academy Newcastle
November 19, 2009	Manchester	England	Manchester Apollo
November 21, 2009	London	England	Brixton Academy
November 22, 2009	Cardiff	Wales	Cardiff University Great Hall
North America, Leg #3
December 4, 2009	Richmond	United States	102.1 The X Not So Silent Night
December 5, 2009	Charlotte	United States	The Fillmore Charlotte
December 6, 2009	Tampa	United States	97X Next Big Thing
December 12, 2009	Los Angeles	United States	KROQ Almost Acoustic Christmas
December 13, 2009	San Diego	United States	91X Wrex the Halls
December 17, 2009	Chicago	United States	Q101's Twisted 2009
December 18, 2009	Chicago	United States	Metro Chicago
Oceania, Leg #3
January 15, 2010	Auckland	New Zealand	Big Day Out
January 17, 2010	Gold Coast	Australia	Big Day Out
January 19, 2010	Sydney	Australia	Enmore Theatre
January 22, 2010	Sydney	Australia	Big Day Out
January 23, 2010	Sydney	Australia	Big Day Out
January 24, 2010	Melbourne	Australia	HiFi Bar and Ballroom
January 26, 2010	Melbourne	Australia	Big Day Out
January 29, 2010	Adelaide	Australia	Big Day Out
January 31, 2010	Perth	Australia	Big Day Out
February 3, 2010	Central Area	Singapore	Big Night Out
North America (Special festival dates)
April 24, 2010	Mexico City	Mexico	Vive Latino
May 1, 2010	West Palm Beach	United States	SunFest
May 22, 2010	Columbus	United States	Rock on the Range
Europe, Leg #4
June 2, 2010	Skive	Denmark	Skive Festival
June 4, 2010	Nuremberg	Germany	Rock im Park
June 5, 2010	Bielefeld	Germany	Ringlokschuppen
June 6, 2010	Nürburg	Germany	Rock am Ring
United States (Special festival date)
June 13, 2010	Manchester	United States	Bonnaroo Music Festival
Europe, Leg #5
June 16, 2010	Gothenburg	Sweden	Sticky Fingers
June 17, 2010	Gothenburg	Sweden	West Coast Riot
June 18, 2010	Zurich	Switzerland	Sonisphere Festival
June 19, 2010	Prague	Czech Republic	Sonisphere Festival
June 21, 2010	Budapest	Hungary	Dürer-kert
June 22, 2010	Zagreb	Croatia	INmusic festival
June 23, 2010	Vienna	Austria	Arena
June 25, 2010	Graz	Austria	Orpheum
June 27, 2010	Nijmegen	Netherlands	Rockin' Park
June 29, 2010	Paris	France	La Cigale
June 30, 2010	Luxembourg City	Luxembourg	Den Atelier
July 1, 2010	Mainz	Germany	Messepark
July 2, 2010	Werchter	Belgium	Rock Werchter
July 4, 2010	Venice	Italy	Heineken Jammin' Festival
July 6, 2010	Lisbon	Portugal	Coliseu dos Recreios
July 8, 2010	Bilbao	Spain	Bilbao BBK Live
July 9, 2010	Ruissalo	Finland	Ruisrock
July 10, 2010	Punchestown	Ireland	Oxegen
July 11, 2010	Balado	Scotland	T in the Park

== Support acts ==
- A Death in the Family (March 25–27, 2009; January 19, 2010; January 24, 2010)
- 50 Lions (March 28, 2009)
- After Midnight Project (December 4, 2009)
- Alkaline Trio (October 2–November 30, 2008)
- All That Remains (July 30, 2009)
- AM Taxi (December 17, 2009)
- Antillectual (June 20, 2008)
- Anti-Flag (February 21–March 4, 2009)
- Advent (December 5, 2009)
- Badday Down (March 29, 2009)
- Billy Talent (July 6–30, 2009)
- CF98 (August 17, 2009)
- Donots (July 1, 2010)
- Down by Law (June 29, 2010)
- Fitacola (July 6, 2010)
- Flobots (February 21–March 6, 2009)
- Killswitch Engage (July 30, 2009)
- Landmines (December 4, 2009)
- Lighthouse Project (October 27, 2009)
- Kong Way Down (June 20, 2008)
- Miles Away (March 24, 2009)
- Misconduct (June 16, 2010)
- Noise By Numbers (December 18, 2009)
- Oneword (October 28, 2009)
- Paranoid Visions (February 19, 2009)
- Poison the Well (November 2–4, 2009; November 7–22, 2009)
- Rancid (June 4–July 31, 2009)
- Red Lights Flash (June 5, 2010; June 23–25, 2010)
- Regulations (October 30, 2009)
- Rentokill (February 3–17, 2009; August 21, 2009)
- Rival Schools (August 21, 2009)
- Riverboat Gamblers (June 4–27, 2009)
- Sage Francis (December 1–12, 2008)
- Saint Alvia (July 31, 2009)
- Semmi Komoly (June 21, 2010)
- Sent by Ravens (December 5, 2009)
- Street Sweeper Social Club (December 17, 2009)
- Strike Anywhere (February 3–17, 2009)
- The (International) Noise Conspiracy (March 24–31, 2009)
- The 20 Belows (October 31, 2009)
- The Bollweevils (December 18, 2009)
- The Demise (February 19, 2009)
- The Gaslight Anthem (October 2–November 30, 2008)
- The King Blues (March 5–6, 2009)
- Thrice (October 2–November 30, 2008)
- Thursday (December 1–12, 2008; November 3–4, 2009; November 7–22, 2009)
- Uncommonmenfrommars (June 29, 2010)
- Versus You (June 30, 2010)
- Whitechapel (July 30, 2009)

== As a support act ==
- Green Day (July 1, 2010)

== Personnel ==
- Tim McIlrath – lead vocals, rhythm guitar
- Joe Principe – bass, backing vocals
- Zach Blair – lead guitar, backing vocals
- Brandon Barnes – drums, percussion

== Songs Played ==
=== From The Unraveling ===
- Alive and Well
- Stained Glass and Marble
- Everchanging

=== From Revolutions per Minute ===
- Heaven Knows
- Dead Ringer
- Halfway There
- Like the Angel
- Blood-Red, White, and Blue
- Broken English
- Torches

=== From Siren Song of the Counter Culture ===
- State of the Union
- Life Less Frightening
- Paper Wings
- Blood to Bleed
- Give It All
- Dancing for Rain
- Swing Life Away

=== From The Sufferer & the Witness ===
- Chamber the Cartridge
- Injection
- Ready to Fall
- Bricks
- Under the Knife
- Prayer of the Refugee
- Drones
- Behind Closed Doors
- The Good Left Undone
- Survive

=== From Appeal to Reason ===
- Collapse (Post-Amerika)
- Long Forgotten Sons
- Re-Education (Through Labor)
- The Dirt Whispered
- From Heads Unworthy
- The Strength to Go On
- Audience of One
- Entertainment
- Hero of War
- Savior
