= The Sufferer & the Witness Tour =

2006–07 concert tour by Rise Against

- Tour by Rise Against
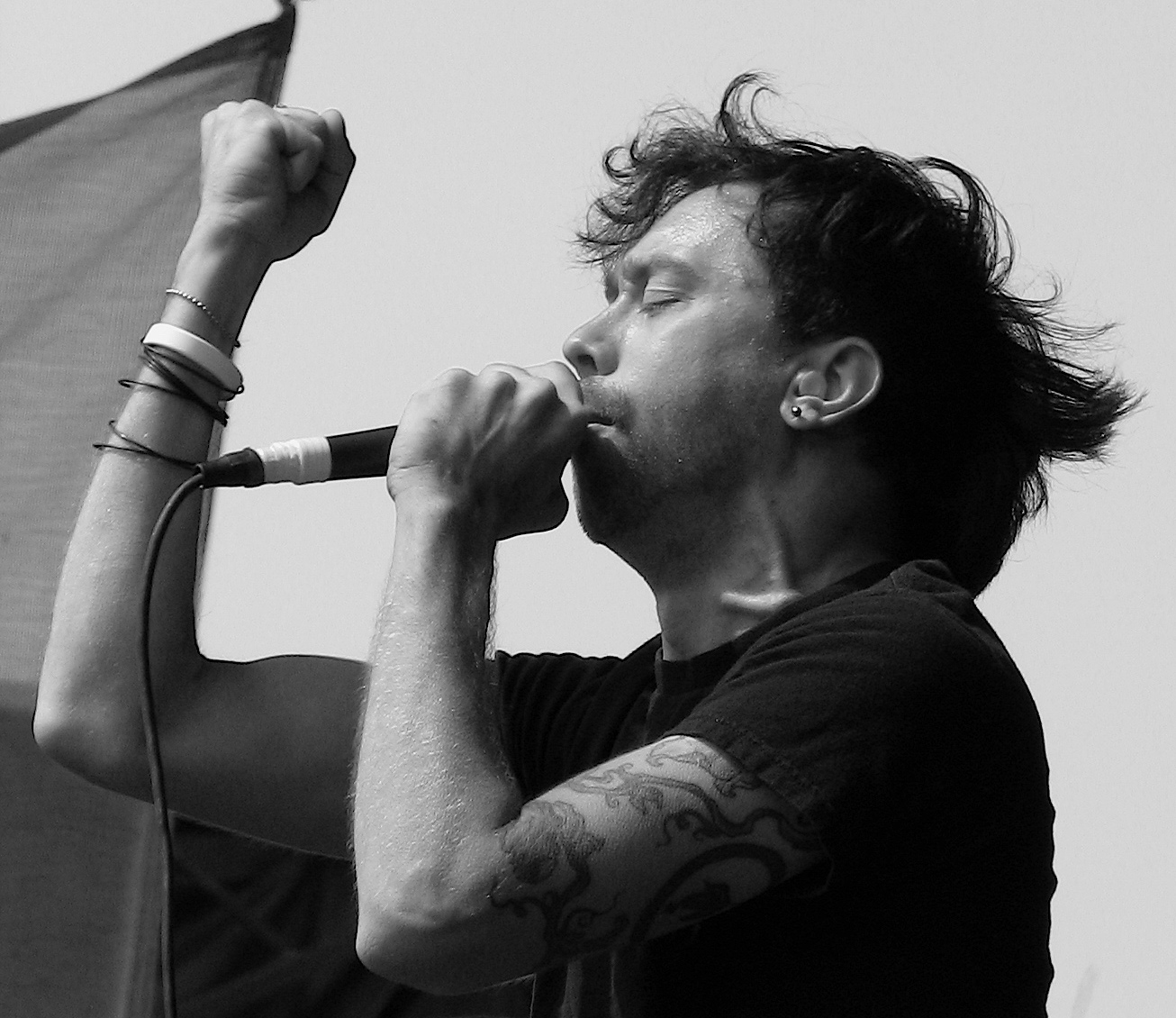
- McIlrath performing with Rise Against during the 2006 Warped Tour in Vancouver
- Location: North America; Europe; Oceania; Asia
- Associated album: The Sufferer & the Witness
- Start date: June 15, 2006
- End date: December 21, 2007
- Legs: 11

Rise Against concert chronology
- Siren Song of the Counter Culture Tour (2004–2005); The Sufferer & the Witness Tour (2006–2007); Appeal to Reason Tour (2008–2010)

The Sufferer & the Witness Tour was a concert tour by punk band Rise Against, that took from 2006 until 2007, in support of their second major label album (fourth overall), The Sufferer & the Witness.

The tour began with the band headlining the 2006 Vans Warped Tour in the summer, a few weeks before the release of the album. The band then embarked on a short European summer leg, with A Wilhelm Scream and Berri Txarrak supporting. The band then returned for a full-scale North American tour with co-headliners Circa Survive, Billy Talent and Thursday though Billy Talent were forced to cancel the first 5 dates and were replaced by Evergreen Terrace. This followed a short Australian tour, followed by another North American leg, which consisted of a Canadian tour, co-headlined by Billy Talent, Anti-Flag and Moneen and the rest were US dates, where the band supported My Chemical Romance. The band then returned for another European leg, supported by Cancer Bats and The Bronx.

Upon returning to the States, the band co-headlined a summer tour with Silverstein and Comeback Kid, with various guest supporting acts, including 2Cents, Smoke or Fire, Sum 41 (1 date), Pennywise and Strung Out (1 date), and Holy Roman Empire, whose singer Emily Schambra contributed vocals to the band's album.

The band then co-headlined the Taste of Chaos 2007 International Edition Tour, in Australia, Japan and Europe. The band performed a shorter than usual set, with co-headliners The Used, Aiden and Gallows, with Drop Dead, Gorgeous and The Bled (in Japan only) and The Blackout (in Europe only). The band finished the tour with a few US special Christmas shows, like the KROQ Almost Acoustic Christmas special.

== Set list ==
2006
- "Survive"
- "State of the Union"
- "Bricks"
- "Black Masks and Gasoline"
- "Prayer of the Refugee"
- "Chamber the Cartridge"
- "Life Less Frightening"
- "Blood to Bleed"
- "Dancing for Rain"
- "Paper Wings"
- "Injection" / "Drones" (Varied between shows)
- "Anywhere But Here"
- "Any Way You Want It" (Journey cover) / "Ohio" (Crosby, Stills, Nash & Young cover) (Varied between shows)
- "Swing Life Away"

Encore

- "Give It All"
- "Ready to Fall"
2007
- "Survive"
- "Under the Knife"
- "Heaven Knows"
- "State of the Union"
- "Chamber the Cartridge"
- "Give It All"
- "Bricks"
- "The Good Left Undone"
- "Like the Angel" / "Blood to Bleed" (Varied between shows)
- "Behind Closed Doors"
- "Black Masks and Gasoline"
- "Worth Dying For" / "Dancing for Rain" (Varied between shows)
- "Injection"
- "Ready to Fall"

Acoustic set

- "Tour Song" (Jawbreaker cover)
- "Swing Life Away"

Encore

- "Alive and Well" / "Tip the Scales" (Varied between shows)
- "Drones"
- "Prayer of the Refugee"
Taste of Chaos Tour 2007
- "Under the Knife"
- "Behind Closed Doors"
- "Heaven Knows"
- "State of the Union"
- "Ready to Fall"
- "Chamber the Cartridge"
- "The Good Left Undone"
- "Survive"
- "Give It All"
- "Blood to Bleed"
- "Like the Angel"
- "Prayer of the Refugee"

== Tour dates ==
Date	City	Country	Venue
North American Leg I As part of the Vans Warped Tour 2006
June 15, 2006	Columbia	United States	Merriweather Post Pavilion
June 16, 2006	Columbus	United States	Germain Amphitheater
June 17, 2006	Milwaukee	United States	Marcus Amphitheater
June 18, 2006	Minneapolis	United States	Hubert H. Humphrey Metrodome
June 19, 2006	Kansas City	United States	Sandstone Amphitheater
June 21, 2006	Nashville	United States	Starwood Amphitheatre
June 22, 2006	Jacksonville	United States	Metropolitan Park
June 23, 2006	Tampa	United States	Vinoy Park
June 24, 2006	Miami	United States	Bicentennial Park
June 25, 2006	Orlando	United States	Tinker Field
June 26, 2006	Ladson	United States	Exchange Park
June 27, 2006	Raleigh	United States	The Time Warner Cable Music Pavilion
June 28, 2006	Atlanta	United States	Hi-Fi Buys Amphitheatre
June 29, 2006	Haddonfield	United States	MarsRED
June 30, 2006	Houston	United States	Reliant Center
July 1, 2006	Dallas	United States	SuperPages.com Center
July 2, 2006	Selma	United States	Verizon Wireless Amphitheater
July 3, 2006	Las Cruces	United States	NMSU Practice Field
July 4, 2006	Phoenix	United States	Cricket Wireless Pavilion
July 5, 2006	Claremont	United States	Rhino Records
July 6, 2006	San Diego	United States	Cricket Wireless Amphitheatre
July 7, 2006	Pomona	United States	Fairplex
July 8, 2006	San Francisco	United States	Pier 30/32
July 9, 2006	Fresno	United States	Selland Arena
July 11, 2006	Ventura	United States	Seaside Park
July 12, 2006	Los Angeles	United States	Dodger Stadium
July 13, 2006	Sacramento	United States	Sleep Train Amphitheatre
July 14, 2006	Boise	United States	Treasure Valley Speedway
July 15, 2006	George	United States	The Gorge Amphitheatre
July 16, 2006	St. Helens	United States	Columbia Meadows
July 18, 2006	Vancouver	Canada	Thunderbird Stadium
July 20, 2006	Calgary	Canada	Race City Speedway
July 22, 2006	Salt Lake City	United States	Utah State Fair Park
July 23, 2006	Denver	United States	Invesco Field
July 25, 2006	St. Louis	United States	UMB Bank Pavilion
July 26, 2006	Cincinnati	United States	Riverbend Music Center
July 27, 2006	Burgettstown	United States	Post-Gazette Pavilion
July 28, 2006	Noblesville	United States	Verizon Wireless Amphitheatre
July 29, 2006	Detroit	United States	Comerica Lot
July 30, 2006	Tinley Park	United States	First Midwest Bank Amphitheatre
August 1, 2006	Darien	United States	Darien Lake PAC
August 2, 2006	Fitchburg	United States	Fitchburg Airport
August 3, 2006	Philadelphia	United States	Tweeter Center at the Waterfront
August 4, 2006	Scranton	United States	Toyota Pavilion
August 5, 2006	Uniondale	United States	Nassau Coliseum
August 6, 2006	Old Bridge	United States	Englishtown Raceway
August 8, 2006	Charlotte	United States	Verizon Wireless Amphitheatre Lot
August 9, 2006	Virginia Beach	United States	Verizon Wireless Amphitheatre Lot
August 10, 2006	Bristow	United States	Nissan Pavilion
August 11, 2006	Cleveland	United States	Tower City Amphitheatre
August 12, 2006	Toronto	Canada	Park Place
August 13, 2006	Montreal	Canada	Park Jean Drapeau
European Leg I Support acts: A Wilhelm Scream and Berri Txarrak
August 25, 2006	Reading	England	Reading Festival
August 26, 2006	Leeds	England	Leeds Festival
August 28, 2006	Cologne	Germany	Live Music Hall
August 29, 2006	Hamburg	Germany	Markthalle Hamburg
August 30, 2006	Berlin	Germany	SO36
August 31, 2006	Wiesen	Austria	2 Days a Week
September 1, 2006	Munich	Germany	Backstage Werk
September 2, 2006	Konstanz	Germany	Rock am See
September 3, 2006	Milan	Italy	Rock In Idro
September 4, 2006	Frankfurt	Germany	Batschkapp
Support act: Alexisonfire
September 6, 2006	Zürich	Switzerland	Abart Music Club
Support acts: A Wilhelm Scream and Berri Txarrak
September 7, 2006	Antwerp	Belgium	Hof Ter Lo
September 8, 2006	Amsterdam	Netherlands	Melkweg
September 9, 2006	Paris	France	Le Trabendo
September 10, 2006	Birmingham	England	O2 Academy Birmingham
September 11, 2006	Manchester	England	Academy 3
September 12, 2006	Glasgow	Scotland	The Garage
September 13, 2006	London	England	London Astoria
North American Leg II
September 23, 2006	Devore	United States	KROQ LA Invasion
September 28, 2006	Hamilton	Canada	Hamilton Convention Centre
September 30, 2006	Tempe	United States	Edgefest
w/ Circa Survive, Thursday and Evergreen Terrace
October 23, 2006	Lake Buena Vista	United States	House of Blues
October 24, 2006	Fort Lauderdale	United States	Revolution
October 26, 2006	Houston	United States	Verizon Wireless Theater
October 27, 2006	Austin	United States	Stubb's Bar-B-Q
October 28, 2006	Fort Worth	United States	Ridglea Theater
w/ Billy Talent, Circa Survive and Thursday
October 30, 2006	Las Vegas	United States	House of Blues
October 31, 2006	San Diego	United States	Soma San Diego
November 3, 2006	Los Angeles	United States	The Wiltern LG
November 4, 2006	Irvine	United States	Bren Events Center
November 5, 2006	San Francisco	United States	The Warfield
November 6, 2006	Portland	United States	Roseland Theater
November 7, 2006	Seattle	United States	Premier
November 9, 2006	Magna	United States	The Great Salt Air Theatre
November 10, 2006	Denver	United States	The Fillmore Auditorium
November 11, 2006	Kansas City	United States	Beaumont Theatre
November 12, 2006	Minneapolis	United States	Myth
November 14, 2006	Chicago	United States	Congress Theater
November 15, 2006	Detroit	United States	State Theatre
November 16, 2006	Columbus	United States	Lifestyle Communities Pavilion
November 17, 2006	Niagara Falls	United States	Dome Theatre
November 18, 2006	Worcester	United States	Palladium
November 20, 2006	Philadelphia	United States	Electric Factory
November 21, 2006	New York City	United States	Roseland Ballroom
November 22, 2006	Atlantic City	United States	House of Blues
Oceania Leg I
November 29, 2006	Brisbane	Australia	The Arena
November 30, 2006	Sydney	Australia	University of NSW Roundhouse
December 1, 2006	Melbourne	Australia	Palace Complex
December 2, 2006	Adelaide	Australia	Fowlers Live
December 5, 2006	Perth	Australia	Club Capitol
December 7, 2006	Auckland	New Zealand	St. James Theatre Complex
North American Leg III Supporting My Chemical Romance, w/ The Red Jumpsuit Apparatus
December 13, 2006	Milwaukee	United States	Riverside Theater
December 15, 2006	Chicago	United States	Aragon Ballroom
Support acts: Death by Stereo and Planes Mistaken for Stars
January 17, 2007	Spokane	United States	Knitting Factory
w/ Billy Talent, Anti-Flag and Moneen
January 18, 2007	Victoria	Canada	Save-On-Foods Memorial Centre
January 19, 2007	Vancouver	Canada	Pacific Coliseum
January 21, 2007	Kelowna	Canada	Prospera Place
January 23, 2007	Lethbridge	Canada	ENMAX Centre
January 24, 2007	Calgary	Canada	Pengrowth Saddledome
January 25, 2007	Edmonton	Canada	Rexall Place
January 27, 2007	Saskatoon	Canada	Credit Union Centre
January 29, 2007	Winnipeg	Canada	MTS Centre
January 30, 2007	Thunder Bay	Canada	Thunder Bay Community Auditorium
February 1, 2007	North Bay	Canada	The Wall-Nipissing University
February 2, 2007	Toronto	Canada	Air Canada Centre
February 3, 2007	Ottawa	Canada	Ottawa Civic Centre
February 5, 2007	Montreal	Canada	Bell Centre
February 6, 2007	Quebec City	Canada	Colisée Pepsi
February 8, 2007	London	Canada	John Labatt Centre
Supporting My Chemical Romance
February 22, 2007	Manchester	United States	Verizon Wireless Arena
February 23, 2007	Uniondale	United States	Nassau Veterans Memorial Coliseum
February 24, 2007	Hartford	United States	Meadows Music Theater
February 25, 2007	Philadelphia	United States	Liacouras Center
February 26, 2007	Cleveland	United States	Wolstein Center
February 28, 2007	Detroit	United States	Joe Louis Arena
March 1, 2007	Rosemont	United States	Allstate Arena
March 2, 2007	Topeka	United States	Kansas Expocentre
March 3, 2007	Lincoln	United States	Pershing Center
March 4, 2007	Denver	United States	Magness Arena
March 6, 2007	West Valley City	United States	E Center
March 7, 2007	Las Vegas	United States	Orleans Arena
March 9, 2007	Glendale	United States	Jobing.com Arena
March 10, 2007	Inglewood	United States	The Forum
March 11, 2007	Anaheim	United States	Anaheim Convention Center
March 13, 2007	San Diego	United States	San Diego Sports Arena
March 14, 2007	Fresno	United States	Selland Arena
March 15, 2007	Oakland	United States	Oracle Arena
Supporting My Chemical Romance, w/ Taking Back Sunday and Underoath
March 16, 2007	Reno	United States	Lawlor Events Center
Headlining date
March 30, 2007	Los Angeles	United States	Kodak Theatre
European Leg II Support acts: Cancer Bats and The Bronx
April 10, 2007	Essen	Germany	Weststadthalle
April 11, 2007	Bielefeld	Germany	Ringlokschuppen
April 13, 2007	Bremen	Germany	Schlachthof
April 14, 2007	Leipzig	Germany	Werk 2
April 15, 2007	Saarbrücken	Germany	Garage
April 16, 2007	Stuttgart	Germany	Longhorn
April 18, 2007	Zürich	Switzerland	Rohstofflager
April 19, 2007	Lausanne	Switzerland	Le Romandie
April 20, 2007	Bologna	Italy	Estragon
April 21, 2007	Milan	Italy	Rainbow Club
April 23, 2007	Prague	Czech Republic	Lucerna Music Bar
April 25, 2007	Vienna	Austria	Outdoor Arena
April 26, 2007	Nürnberg	Germany	Der Hirsch
April 28, 2007	Meerhout	Belgium	Groezrock Festival
April 29, 2007	Amsterdam	Netherlands	Melkweg
May 1, 2007	Dublin	Ireland	Temple Bar Music Centre
May 3, 2007	Cardiff	England	Cardiff University Great Hall
May 4, 2007	Oxford	England	O2 Academy Oxford
May 5, 2007	Norwich	England	The Waterfront
May 6, 2007	Leeds	England	Leeds Metropolitan University
May 7, 2007	Glasgow	Scotland	Queen Margaret Union
May 9, 2007	Wolverhampton	England	Wulfrun Hall
May 10, 2007	Manchester	England	Club Academy
May 12, 2007	London	England	London Astoria
North American Leg IV
May 19, 2007	Irvine	United States	KROQ Weenie Roast
May 20, 2007	Vancouver	Canada	Virgin Festival
w/ Silverstein and Comeback Kid
June 15, 2007	Dallas	United States	The Palladium Ballroom
June 16, 2007	Austin	United States	Stubb's Bar-B-Q
June 18, 2007	St. Petersburg	United States	Jannus Landing
June 19, 2007	Orlando	United States	House of Blues
June 20, 2007	Atlanta	United States	DuPre Excelsior Mill
June 22, 2007	North Myrtle Beach	United States	House of Blues
June 23, 2007	Charlotte	United States	Tremont Music Hall
June 24, 2007	Norfolk	United States	Norva Theatre
June 25, 2007	Philadelphia	United States	Electric Factory
June 27, 2007	New York City	United States	Nokia Theatre Times Square
June 28, 2007	Hartford	United States	Webster Theater
June 29, 2007	Sayreville	United States	Starland Ballroom
June 30, 2007	Milwaukee	United States	Summerfest
w/ Silverstein and Comeback Kid Support act: 2Cents
July 2, 2007	Dartmouth	Canada	Alderney Landing
July 4, 2007	Quebec City	Canada	Centre du Foire
July 5, 2007	Montreal	Canada	Olympia Theatre
July 6, 2007	Montreal	Canada	Olympia Theatre
July 7, 2007	Mississauga	Canada	Arrow Hall
w/ Silverstein and Comeback Kid
July 9, 2007	Williamsville	United States	Evolution
w/ Silverstein and Comeback Kid Support act: 2Cents
July 10, 2007	Pittsburgh	United States	Club Zoo
July 11, 2007	Cincinnati	United States	Bogart's
July 13, 2007	Green Bay	United States	Riverside Ballroom
July 14, 2007	Saint Paul	United States	Myth
w/ Silverstein and Comeback Kid Support act: Holy Roman Empire
July 16, 2007	Winnipeg	Canada	Winnipeg Convention Centre
July 17, 2007	Saskatoon	Canada	Prairieland Park
July 18, 2007	Edmonton	Canada	Shaw Conference Centre
July 19, 2007	Calgary	Canada	Canada MacEwan Hall
July 20, 2007	Calgary	Canada	Canada MacEwan Hall
July 22, 2007	Victoria	Canada	Victoria Curling Club
July 23, 2007	Seattle	United States	The Fenix Underground Inc.
July 24, 2007	Portland	United States	Roseland Theatre
July 26, 2007	Boise	United States	The Big Easy
July 27, 2007	Reno	United States	The New Oasis
July 28, 2007	San Francisco	United States	The Warfield
July 29, 2007	Sacramento	United States	Empire Events Center
w/ Silverstein and Comeback Kid Support act: Smoke or Fire
August 16, 2007	Baltimore	United States	Rams Head Live!
August 17, 2007	Boston	United States	Avalon Ballroom
August 18, 2007	Providence	United States	Lupo's Heartbreak Hotel
August 19, 2007	Clifton Park	United States	Northern Lights
August 21, 2007	Allentown	United States	Crocodile Rock Café
August 22, 2007	Cleveland	United States	House of Blues
August 23, 2007	Detroit	United States	The Fillmore Detroit
August 24, 2007	Chicago	United States	Congress Theater
August 27, 2007	Grand Rapids	United States	Orbit Room
August 28, 2007	Sauget	United States	Pop's
August 29, 2007	Kansas City	United States	The Beaumont Club
August 30, 2007	Omaha	United States	Sokol Auditorium
w/ Silverstein and Comeback Kid
September 4, 2007	Tulsa	United States	Cain's Ballroom
September 5, 2007	Albuquerque	United States	Sunshine Building
September 6, 2007	Mesa	United States	Mesa Amphitheatre
September 7, 2007	San Diego	United States	Soma San Diego
September 8, 2007	Ventura	United States	Majestic Ventura Theatre
September 11, 2007	Las Vegas	United States	House of Blues
September 12, 2007	Magna	United States	The Great Salt Air Theatre
w/ Silverstein, Comeback Kid and Sum 41
September 13, 2007	Denver	United States	Red Rocks Amphitheatre
w/ Silverstein, Comeback Kid, Strung Out and Lagwagon
September 15, 2007	Long Beach	United States	Long Beach Convention and Entertainment Center
w/ Silverstein Support act: Holy Roman Empire
September 19, 2007	Chicago, Illinois	United States	Congress Theater
Oceania Leg II (Taste of Chaos International Tour 2007) w/ The Used, Aiden, Drop Dead, Gorgeous, The Bled and Gallows
October 19, 2007	Perth	Australia	Burswood Entertainment Complex
October 21, 2007	Adelaide	Australia	Adelaide Entertainment Centre
October 23, 2007	Melbourne	Australia	Hisense Arena
October 25, 2007	Sydney	Australia	Sydney Entertainment Centre
October 26, 2007	Brisbane	Australia	Brisbane Entertainment Centre
October 28, 2007	Auckland	New Zealand	St. James Theatre Complex
Japanese Leg I (Taste of Chaos International Tour 2007) w/ The Used, Aiden, Drop Dead, Gorgeous, The Bled and Gallows
November 1, 2007	Osaka	Japan	Namba Hatch
November 2, 2007	Nagoya	Japan	Zepp
November 4, 2007	Tokyo	Japan	AgeHa
European Leg III (Taste of Chaos International Tour 2007) w/ The Used, Aiden, |Gallows and The Blackout
November 7, 2007	Tilburg	Netherlands	013
November 8, 2007	Luxembourg	Luxembourg	Den Atelier
November 9, 2007	Brussels	Belgium	Ancienne Belgique
November 11, 2007	Vienna	Austria	Gasometer
November 12, 2007	Cologne	Germany	Palladium
November 13, 2007	Saarbrücken	Germany	E-Werk
November 15, 2007	Munich	Germany	Zenith
November 16, 2007	Bologna	Italy	Estragon
November 17, 2007	Basel	Switzerland	Z7
November 19, 2007	Portsmouth	England	Portsmouth Guildhall
November 21, 2007	Birmingham	England	O2 Academy Birmingham
November 22, 2007	Cardiff	England	Cardiff International Arena
November 23, 2007	Newcastle upon Tyne	England	O2 Academy Newcastle
November 24, 2007	Glasgow	Scotland	O2 Academy Glasgow
November 25, 2007	Leeds	England	Leeds Metropolitan University
November 27, 2007	Manchester	England	Manchester Apollo
November 28, 2007	London	England	Brixton Academy
North American Leg V
December 1, 2007	West Palm Beach	United States	WPBZ Buzz Bake Sale
December 2, 2007	Tampa	United States	97X Next Big Thing
December 8, 2007	Universal City	United States	KROQ Almost Acoustic Christmas
w/ Pennywise and Riverboat Gamblers
December 20, 2007	Edmonton	Canada	Jingle Bell Rock Show
December 21, 2007	Calgary	Canada	Jingle Bell Rock Show

== Personnel ==
- Tim McIlrath – lead vocals, rhythm guitar
- Joe Principe – bass, backing vocals
- Zach Blair – lead guitar, backing vocals (2007)
- Chris Chasse – lead guitar, backing vocals (2006–2007)
- Brandon Barnes – drums, percussion

== Support acts ==
- 2Cents (July 2–7, 10–14, 2007)
- A Wilhelm Scream (August 28–30, 2006; September 1, 4–13, 2006)
- Airway (November 16, 2007)
- Anti-Flag (January 18–February 8, 2007)
- Antagonist (October 28, 2007)
- Berri Txarrak (August 28–30, 2006; September 1, 6–13, 2006)
- Break Even (December 5, 2006)
- Callista (October 28, 2007)
- Campus (November 9, 2007)
- Cancer Bats (April 10–May 12, 2007)
- Carpathian (October 19–26, 2007)
- Circa Survive (October 23–November 22, 2006)
- Comeback Kid (June 15–27, 2007; July 2–September 15, 2007)
- Cyanide City (October 28, 2007)
- Death by Stereo (January 17, 2007)
- Drop Dead, Gorgeous (October 19–28, 2007; November 1–4, 2007)
- Evergreen Terrace (October 23–28, 2006)
- False Start (October 28, 2007)
- Gallows (October 19–28, 2007; November 1–4, 2007; November 7–28, 2007)
- God So Loved the World (December 1, 2006)
- Holy Roman Empire (June 15, 2007; July 16–29, 2007; September 19, 2007)
- Lagwagon (September 15, 2007)
- Miles Away (December 5, 2006)
- Moneen (January 18–February 8, 2007)
- Not Advised (November 19, 2007)
- Planes Mistaken for Stars (January 17, 2007)
- Pro Team (December 1, 2006)
- Silverstein (June 15–27, 2007; July 2–September 19, 2007)
- Smoke or Fire (August 16–30, 2007)
- Strung Out (September 15, 2007)
- Sum 41 (September 13, 2007)
- Taking Back Sunday (March 16, 2007)
- The Blackout (November 7–28, 2007)
- The Bled (October 19–28, 2007; November 1–4, 2007)
- The Bronx (April 10–May 12, 2007)
- Thursday (October 23–November 22, 2006)
- Underoath (March 16, 2007)
- We Are the Ocean (November 28, 2007)

== Co-headlining ==
- Billy Talent (October 30–November 22, 2006; January 18–February 8, 2007)
- The Used (October 19–28, 2007; November 1–4, 2007; November 7–28, 2007)
- Aiden (October 19–28, 2007; November 1–4, 2007; November 7–28, 2007)

== As a supporting act ==
- My Chemical Romance (February 22–March 16, 2007)

== Songs played ==
=== From The Unraveling ===
- Alive and Well

=== From Revolutions per Minute ===
- Black Masks and Gasoline
- Heaven Knows
- Like the Angel
- Any Way You Want It (Journey cover)

=== From Siren Song of the Counter Culture ===
- State of the Union
- Life Less Frightening
- Paper Wings
- Blood to Bleed
- Tip the Scales
- Anywhere But Here
- Give It All
- Dancing for Rain
- Swing Life Away

=== From The Sufferer & the Witness ===
- Chamber the Cartridge
- Injection
- Ready to Fall
- Bricks
- Under the Knife
- Prayer of the Refugee
- Drones
- Behind Closed Doors
- Roadside
- The Good Left Undone
- Survive

=== Others ===
- Ohio (Crosby, Stills, Nash & Young cover)
- Tour Song (Jawbreaker cover)
