= Endgame Tour =

2011–13 concert tour by Rise Against

- Tour by Rise Against
- Location: North America; Europe; South America
- Associated album: Endgame
- Start date: February 25, 2011
- End date: November 16, 2013
- Legs: 13
- No. of shows: 184; 102 in North America; 66 in Europe; 6 in Oceania; 7 in South America; 1 in Central America; 2 in Africa

Rise Against concert chronology
- Appeal to Reason Tour (2008–2010); Endgame Tour (2011–2013)

The Endgame Tour was a concert tour by punk band Rise Against, taking place from 2011 to 2013, in support of their sixth full-length studio album Endgame.

The tour began on February 25, 2011, with the band's first visit to South America, playing a short leg with two dates in Brazil and one in Argentina with supporting act Berri Txarrak. This followed a short tour of small venues in Europe with supporting act Coliseum, and a major US tour with supporting acts Bad Religion and Four Year Strong.

In July, the band headlined a tour of Oceania with supporting acts Sick of It All and Break Even, which was followed by a run of European festival dates in August, including playing the Reading and Leeds Festivals.

The band was then chosen as the main guest supporting act on the Foo Fighters' fall headlining tour in support of Wasting Light, which took place in September, after which Rise Against headlined their own Canadian tour with supporting acts Flogging Molly and The Black Pacific. Between November 2–13, 2011, the band played their first UK headlining tour in 2 years, supported by Tom Morello: The Nightwatchman and Polar Bear Club, the band also played one date in Scotland during the tour, and added an additional date in Rome, Italy on November 15. In December, the band played a series of Christmas special radio festival shows.

The band's first tour of 2012 was another US headlining leg, which was supported by A Day to Remember and The Menzingers, with Glassjaw also joining as a special guest supporting act at the New York City show on February 3. Between February 28–March 20, 2012, the band headlined another tour of Europe, visiting countries they haven't visited in years like Norway, Finland and the Czech Republic, and also touring Germany. The tour was supported by Architects and Touché Amoré. The band followed with another leg of the US in April–May, which was supported by A Day to Remember and Title Fight.

== Set list ==
South America, Leg #1
- "Chamber the Cartridge"
- "State of the Union"
- "The Good Left Undone"
- "Heaven Knows"
- "Re-Education (Through Labor)"
- "Survive"
- "Like the Angel"
- "Help Is on the Way"
- "The Dirt Whispered"
- "Injection"
- "Prayer of the Refugee"
- "Audience of One"
- "Architects"
- "Savior"

Acoustic set

- "Swing Life Away"
- "Hero of War"

Encore

- "Give It All"
- "Alive and Well"
- "Ready to Fall"
Europe, Leg #1
- "Chamber the Cartridge"
- "State of the Union"
- "The Good Left Undone"
- "Heaven Knows"
- "Re-Education (Through Labor)"
- "Survive"
- "Like the Angel"
- "Help Is on the Way"
- "The Dirt Whispered"
- "Injection"
- "Prayer of the Refugee"
- "Audience of One"
- "Architects"
- "Savior"

Acoustic set

- "Swing Life Away"
- "Hero of War"

Encore

- "Alive and Well" / "Stained Glass and Marble" / "Remains of Summer Memories" / "Six Ways 'Til Sunday" (Varied between shows)
- "Give It All"
- "Ready to Fall"
North America, Leg #1
- "Chamber the Cartridge"
- "Satellite"
- "The Good Left Undone"
- "Heaven Knows" / "Like the Angel" (Varied between shows)
- "Re-Education (Through Labor)"
- "Survive"
- "Make It Stop (September's Children)"
- "The Dirt Whispered"
- "Help Is on the Way"
- "From Heads Unworthy"
- "Prayer of the Refugee"
- "Audience of One"
- "Architects"
- "Ready to Fall"

Acoustic set

- "Swing Life Away"
- "Hero of War"

Encore

- "Entertainment"
- "Blood-Red, White & Blue" (Not played on every date)
- "Savior"
- "Give It All"
Oceania, Leg #1
- "Chamber the Cartridge"
- "Satellite"
- "The Good Left Undone"
- "Heaven Knows"
- "Re-Education (Through Labor)"
- "Survive"
- "Make It Stop (September's Children)"
- "The Dirt Whispered"
- "Help Is on the Way"
- "From Heads Unworthy"
- "Prayer of the Refugee"
- "Swing Life Away"
- "Hero of War"
- "Audience of One"
- "Architects"
- "Ready to Fall"

Encore

- "Entertainment"
- "Savior"
- "Give It All"
Europe, Leg #2
- "Chamber the Cartridge"
- "Satellite"
- "The Good Left Undone"
- "Heaven Knows"
- "Re-Education (Through Labor)"
- "Survive"
- "Make It Stop (September's Children)"
- "The Dirt Whispered"
- "Help Is on the Way"
- "From Heads Unworthy"
- "Prayer of the Refugee"
- "Swing Life Away"
- "Hero of War"
- "Audience of One"
- "Architects"
- "Ready to Fall"

Encore

- "Entertainment"
- "Savior"
- "Give It All"
North America, Leg #2 (Supporting Foo Fighters)
- "Re-Education (Through Labor)"
- "The Good Left Undone"
- "Satellite"
- "Audience of One"
- "Ready to Fall"
- "Make It Stop (September's Children)"
- "Help Is on the Way"
- "Prayer of the Refugee"
- "Give It All"
- "Savior"
North America, Leg #2 (Headlining)
- "Re-Education (Through Labor)"
- "Satellite"
- "The Good Left Undone"
- "Long Forgotten Sons" / "Chamber the Cartridge" (Varied between shows)
- "Make It Stop (September's Children)"
- "The Dirt Whispered"
- "Collapse (Post-Amerika)" / "From Heads Unworthy" (Varied between shows)
- "Help Is on the Way"
- "Survive"
- "Prayer of the Refugee"
- "Everchanging" / "Swing Life Away" (Varied between shows)
- "Hero of War"
- "Audience of One"
- "Architects"
- "Ready to Fall"

Encore

- "Entertainment" / "Drones" (Varied between shows)
- "Give It All"
- "Savior"
Europe, Leg #3
- "Re-Education (Through Labor)"
- "Satellite"
- "The Good Left Undone"
- "Heaven Knows"
- "Chamber the Cartridge"
- "Survive"
- "Make It Stop (September's Children)"
- "The Dirt Whispered"
- "Help Is on the Way"
- "From Heads Unworthy"
- "Prayer of the Refugee"
- "Swing Life Away"
- "Hero of War"
- "Audience of One"
- "Architects"
- "Ready to Fall"

Encore

- "Torches" (Played on two dates)
- "Give It All"
- "Savior"
North America, Leg #3
- "Re-Education (Through Labor)"
- "Satellite"
- "The Good Left Undone"
- "Heaven Knows"
- "Chamber the Cartridge"
- "Survive"
- "Make It Stop (September's Children)"
- "The Dirt Whispered"
- "Help Is on the Way"
- "From Heads Unworthy"
- "Prayer of the Refugee"
- "Swing Life Away"
- "Hero of War"
- "Audience of One"
- "Architects"
- "Ready to Fall"

Encore

- "Give It All"
- "Savior"
North America, Leg #4
- "Survivor Guilt"
- "Ready to Fall"
- "Collapse (Post-Amerika)"
- "The Good Left Undone"
- "Broken English"
- "Help Is on the Way"
- "Disparity By Design"
- "Drones"
- "Re-Education (Through Labor)"
- "Blood to Bleed"
- "Satellite"
- "Paper Wings"
- "Prayer of the Refugee"
- "Like the Angel" / "Swing Life Away" (Acoustic) (Varied between shows)
- "Audience of One" (Acoustic)
- "Make It Stop (September's Children)"
- "Give It All"

Encore

- "Midnight Hands"
- "The Strength to Go On"
- "Savior"
Europe, Leg #4
- "Survivor Guilt"
- "Ready to Fall"
- "Collapse (Post-Amerika)"
- "The Good Left Undone"
- "Broken English"
- "Help Is on the Way"
- "Disparity By Design"
- "Drones"
- "Re-Education (Through Labor)"
- "Blood to Bleed"
- "Satellite"
- "Paper Wings"
- "Prayer of the Refugee"
- "Audience of One" (Acoustic)
- "Swing Life Away" (Acoustic)
- "Hero of War" (Acoustic) (Not played on every date)
- "Make It Stop (September's Children)"
- "Give It All"

Encore

- "Midnight Hands"
- "The Strength to Go On"
- "Savior"
North America, Leg #5
- "Survivor Guilt"
- "Ready to Fall"
- "Collapse (Post-Amerika)"
- "The Good Left Undone"
- "Broken English"
- "Help Is on the Way"
- "Disparity By Design"
- "Drones"
- "Re-Education (Through Labor)"
- "Blood to Bleed"
- "Satellite"
- "Paper Wings"
- "Prayer of the Refugee"
- "Audience of One" (Acoustic)
- "Swing Life Away" (Acoustic)
- "Make It Stop (September's Children)"
- "Give It All"

Encore

- "Midnight Hands"
- "The Strength to Go On"
- "Savior"
Europe, Leg #5
- "Survivor Guilt"
- "Ready to Fall"
- "Collapse (Post-Amerika)"
- "The Good Left Undone"
- "Broken English"
- "Help Is on the Way"
- "Disparity By Design"
- "Drones"
- "Re-Education (Through Labor)"
- "Blood to Bleed"
- "Satellite"
- "Paper Wings"
- "Prayer of the Refugee"
- "Audience of One" (Acoustic)
- "Swing Life Away" (Acoustic)
- "Make It Stop (September's Children)"
- "Give It All"

Encore

- "Midnight Hands"
- "The Strength to Go On"
- "Savior"
North America, Leg #6
- "Survivor Guilt"
- "Ready to Fall"
- "Collapse (Post-Amerika)"
- "The Good Left Undone"
- "Heaven Knows" / "Broken English" (Varied between shows)
- "Help Is on the Way"
- "Drones"
- "Disparity By Design"
- "Re-Education (Through Labor)"
- "Blood to Bleed"
- "Satellite"
- "Wait for Me"
- "Prayer of the Refugee"
- "Swing Life Away" (Acoustic)
- "For Fiona" (Acoustic, No Use for a Name cover)
- "Make It Stop (September's Children)"
- "Give It All"

Encore

- "Midnight Hands" / "Broken Mirrors" (Varied between shows)
- "The Strength to Go On"
- "Savior"

== Tour dates ==
Date	City	Country	Venue
South America, Leg #1; Support act: Berri Txarrak
February 25, 2011	Curitiba	Brazil	Curitiba Master Hall
February 26, 2011	São Paulo	Brazil	Carioca Club
February 27, 2011	Buenos Aires	Argentina	Groove
Europe, Leg #1; Support act: Coliseum
March 11, 2011	Madrid	Spain	La Riviera
March 12, 2011	Barcelona	Spain	Razzmatazz
March 13, 2011	Tilburg	Netherlands	013
March 15, 2011	Antwerp	Belgium	Hof Ter Lo
March 16, 2011	London	England	Electric Ballroom
March 19, 2011	Stockholm	Sweden	Globens Annex
March 20, 2011	Copenhagen	Denmark	Store Vega
March 22, 2011	Mainz	Germany	Phoenixhalle (Mombach)
March 23, 2011	Cologne	Germany	Palladium
March 25, 2011	Berlin	Germany	Columbiahalle
March 26, 2011	Munich	Germany	Zenith
March 27, 2011	Leipzig	Germany	Haus Auensee
North America, Leg #1; Support acts: Bad Religion and Four Year Strong
April 5, 2011	Paradise	United States	The Joint
April 7, 2011	Long Beach	United States	Long Beach Arena
April 8, 2011	San Diego	United States	RIMAC Arena
April 9, 2011	San Francisco	United States	Bill Graham Civic Auditorium
April 11, 2011	Portland	United States	Rose Garden Arena
April 12, 2011	Seattle	United States	WaMu Theater at Qwest Field
April 14, 2011	Magna	United States	The Great Saltair
April 15, 2011	Denver	United States	Fillmore Auditorium
April 16, 2011	Denver	United States	Fillmore Auditorium
April 19, 2011	Austin	United States	Stubb's Bar-B-Q
April 20, 2011	Corpus Christi	United States	Concrete Street Amphitheater
April 22, 2011	St. Augustine	United States	St. Augustine Amphitheatre
April 23, 2011	Boca Raton	United States	Sunset Cove Amphitheater
April 25, 2011	North Myrtle Beach	United States	House of Blues
April 26, 2011	Washington, D.C.	United States	9:30 Club
April 27, 2011	Baltimore	United States	Rams Head Live!
April 29, 2011	Boston	United States	House of Blues
April 30, 2011	Boston	United States	House of Blues
May 2, 2011	Philadelphia	United States	Electric Factory
May 3, 2011	Philadelphia	United States	Electric Factory
May 5, 2011	New York City	United States	Terminal 5
May 6, 2011	New York City	United States	Terminal 5
May 7, 2011	Cleveland	United States	Nautica Pavilion
May 8, 2011	Champaign	United States	Assembly Hall
May 10, 2011	Sauget	United States	Pop's
May 11, 2011	Kansas City	United States	Midland Theatre
May 13, 2011	Chicago	United States	Aragon Ballroom
May 14, 2011	Chicago	United States	Aragon Ballroom
June 4, 2011	Irvine	United States	KROQ Weenie Roast
July 3, 2011	Milwaukee	United States	Summerfest
July 8, 2011	Ottawa	Canada	Cisco Ottawa Bluesfest
July 9, 2011	Toronto	Canada	Edgefest
Oceania; Support acts: Sick of It All and Break Even
July 14, 2011	Auckland	New Zealand	Logan Campbell Centre
July 16, 2011	Sydney	Australia	Sydney Entertainment Centre
July 18, 2011	Brisbane	Australia	Brisbane Entertainment Centre
July 21, 2011	Melbourne	Australia	Festival Hall
July 22, 2011	Adelaide	Australia	Adelaide Entertainment Centre
July 23, 2011	Perth	Australia	Challenge Stadium
United States (special festival date)
July 30, 2011	Los Angeles	United States	L.A. Rising Festival
Europe, Leg #2
August 10, 2011	Budapest	Hungary	Sziget Festival
August 12, 2011	Rothenburg ob der Tauber	Germany	Taubertal Festival
August 13, 2011	Düsseldorf	Germany	Philipshalle
August 14, 2011	Eschwege	Germany	Open Flair Festival
August 15, 2011	Luxembourg City	Luxembourg	Den Atelier
August 19, 2011	Biddinghuizen	Netherlands	Lowlands Festival
August 20, 2011	Sankt Pölten	Austria	FM4 Frequency Festival
August 21, 2011	Leipzig	Germany	Highfield Festival
August 23, 2011	Zürich	Switzerland	X-tra
August 24, 2011	Chiemsee	Germany	Chiemsee Rocks
August 26, 2011	Reading	England	Reading Festival
August 27, 2011	Leeds	England	Leeds Festival
August 28, 2011	Pinneberg	Germany	Telekom Extreme Playgrounds
North America, Leg #2; Supporting Foo Fighters, w/ The Bronx (9/14-9/26); Support acts: Flogging Molly and The Black Pacific (9/30-10/12)
September 14, 2011	Saint Paul	United States	Xcel Energy Center
September 16, 2011	Kansas City	United States	Sprint Center
September 17, 2011	St. Louis	United States	Scottrade Center
September 19, 2011	Auburn Hills	United States	The Palace of Auburn Hills
September 20, 2011	Cleveland	United States	Quicken Loans Arena
September 22, 2011	Columbus	United States	Nationwide Arena
September 23, 2011	Pittsburgh	United States	Consol Energy Center
September 25, 2011	Buffalo	United States	HSBC Arena
September 26, 2011	East Rutherford	United States	Izod Center
September 27, 2011	Atlantic City	United States	House of Blues
September 28, 2011	Clifton Park	United States	Northern Lights
September 30, 2011	Quebec City	Canada	Agora Du Vieux
October 1, 2011	Montreal	Canada	CEPSUM
October 2, 2011	London	Canada	John Labatt Centre
October 4, 2011	Thunder Bay	Canada	Thunder Bay Community Auditorium
October 6, 2011	Winnipeg	Canada	MTS Centre
October 7, 2011	Saskatoon	Canada	Credit Union Centre
October 8, 2011	Edmonton	Canada	Rexall Place
October 9, 2011	Calgary	Canada	Scotiabank Saddledome
October 11, 2011	Victoria	Canada	Save-On-Foods Memorial Centre
October 12, 2011	Vancouver	Canada	Pacific Coliseum
Europe, Leg #3; Support acts: Tom Morello: The Nightwatchman and Polar Bear Club
November 2, 2011	Nottingham	England	Rock City
November 3, 2011	Leeds	England	O_{2} Academy Leeds
November 4, 2011	Glasgow	Scotland	O_{2} Academy Glasgow
November 5, 2011	Manchester	England	O_{2} Apollo Manchester
November 7, 2011	Birmingham	England	O_{2} Academy Birmingham
November 8, 2011	Newcastle upon Tyne	England	O_{2} Academy Newcastle
November 9, 2011	London	England	O_{2} Academy Brixton
November 10, 2011	Norwich	England	UEA
November 12, 2011	Bristol	England	O_{2} Academy Bristol
November 13, 2011	Southampton	England	Southampton Guildhall
November 15, 2011	Rome	Italy	Atlántico
North America, Leg #3
December 2, 2011	Grand Prairie	United States	102.1 FM How the Edge Stole Christmas
December 3, 2011	Houston	United States	BuzzFestivus
December 4, 2011	Tulsa	United States	Brady Theater
December 6, 2011	Broomfield	United States	1stBank Center
December 8, 2011	Las Vegas	United States	X107.5 Holiday Havoc
December 10, 2011	Fresno	United States	104.1 Nightmare Before Xmas
December 17, 2011	Detroit	United States	The Night 89X Stole Christmas
North America, Leg #4; Support acts: A Day to Remember and The Menzingers
January 17, 2012	Austin	United States	Austin Music Hall
January 18, 2012	San Antonio	United States	Illusions Theater at Alamodome
January 19, 2012	New Orleans	United States	House of Blues
January 21, 2012	Orlando	United States	UCF Arena
January 22, 2012	Columbia	United States	Township Auditorium
January 24, 2012	Norfolk	United States	Ted Constant Convocation Center
January 26, 2012	Kent	United States	Memorial Athletic and Convocation Center
January 27, 2012	Chicago	United States	UIC Pavilion
January 29, 2012	University Park	United States	Bryce Jordan Center
January 30, 2012	Poughkeepsie	United States	Mid-Hudson Civic Center
February 1, 2012	Lowell	United States	Paul E. Tsongas Arena
February 3, 2012	Uniondale	United States	Nassau Veterans Memorial Coliseum
February 4, 2012	Camden	United States	Susquehanna Bank Center
February 5, 2012	Fairfax	United States	Patriot Center
Europe, Leg #4; Support acts: Architects and Touché Amoré
February 28, 2012	Brussels	Belgium	Ancienne Belgique
March 1, 2012	Dortmund	Germany	Westfalenhallen
March 2, 2012	Stuttgart	Germany	Hanns-Martin-Schleyer-Halle
March 3, 2012	Berlin	Germany	Berlin Arena
March 5, 2012	Aarhus	Denmark	Voxhall
March 6, 2012	Stockholm	Sweden	Fryshuset
March 7, 2012	Oslo	Norway	Sentrum Scene
March 9, 2012	Helsinki	Finland	The Circus
March 10, 2012	Helsinki	Finland	The Circus
March 12, 2012	Saint Petersburg	Russia	Club Kosmonaut
March 13, 2012	Moscow	Russia	Moscow Arena
March 15, 2012	Warsaw	Poland	Stodola
March 16, 2012	Prague	Czech Republic	Incheba Arena
March 18, 2012	Leipzig	Germany	Arena Leipzig
March 19, 2012	Budapest	Hungary	Petőfi Csarnok
March 20, 2012	Vienna	Austria	Wiener Stadthalle
North America, Leg #5; Support acts: A Day to Remember and Title Fight
April 15, 2012	San Diego	United States	Viejas Arena
April 16, 2012	Bakersfield	United States	Rabobank Arena
April 17, 2012	San Jose	United States	Event Center
April 19, 2012	Kent	United States	ShoWare Center
April 20, 2012	Boise	United States	CenturyLink Arena
April 21, 2012	Salt Lake City	United States	Saltair
April 23, 2012	Rio Rancho	United States	Santa Ana Star Center
April 26, 2012	Pelham	United States	Oak Mountain Amphitheatre – Charter Stage
April 27, 2012	St. Augustine	United States	St. Augustine Amphitheater
April 28, 2012	Boca Raton	United States	Sunset Cove Amphitheater
April 30, 2012	Tampa	United States	Green Iguana Stadium
May 1, 2012	Atlanta	United States	Masquerade Music Park
May 2, 2012	Charlotte	United States	Time Warner Cable Uptown Amphitheater
May 4, 2012	Indianapolis	United States	The Lawn at White River State Park
May 5, 2012	Cincinnati	United States	PNC Pavilion at Riverbend Music
May 6, 2012	Pittsburgh	United States	Stage AE (outdoors)
May 8, 2012	Syracuse	United States	Chevy Court at New York State Fair
May 10, 2012	Toronto	Canada	Air Canada Centre
Europe, Leg #5
June 8, 2012	Nickelsdorf	Austria	Nova Rock Festival
June 10, 2012	Donington	England	Download Festival
June 12, 2012	Tilburg	Netherlands	013
June 13, 2012	Esch-sur-Alzette	Luxembourg	Rockhal
June 14, 2012	Paris	France	Bataclan
June 16, 2012	Seinäjoki	Finland	Provinssirock
June 17, 2012	Interlaken	Switzerland	Greenfield Festival
June 19, 2012	Milan	Italy	Magnolia
June 20, 2012	Warsaw	Poland	Sowinskiego Park
June 23, 2012	Scheeßel	Germany	Hurricane Festival
June 24, 2012	Tuttlingen	Germany	Southside Festival
June 26, 2012	Arendal	Norway	Hove Festival
June 27, 2012	Borlänge	Sweden	Peace & Love
June 28, 2012	Werchter	Belgium	Rock Werchter
North America (Special 2012 Vans Warped Tour dates)
July 5, 2012	Maryland Heights	United States	Verizon Wireless Amphitheater
July 6, 2012	Auburn Hills	United States	The Palace of Auburn Hills
July 8, 2012	Shakopee	United States	Canterbury Park
July 9, 2012	Bonner Springs	United States	Sandstone Amphitheater
North America, Leg #6; Support acts: Hot Water Music and The Gaslight Anthem
September 9, 2012	Halifax	Canada	Citadel Hill Garrison Ground
September 11, 2012	Quebec City	Canada	L'Agora Port de Quebec
September 12, 2012	Montreal	Canada	Bell Centre
September 13, 2012	Ottawa	Canada	CE Centre
September 15, 2012	Chicago	United States	Riot Fest
September 16, 2012	Milwaukee	United States	Eagles Ballroom
September 17, 2012	Walker	United States	DeltaPlex Arena
September 20, 2012	Houston	United States	Bayou Music Center
September 21, 2012	Corpus Christi	United States	Concrete Street Amphitheatre
September 22, 2012	Dallas	United States	Riot Fest
September 24, 2012	Denver	United States	Fillmore Auditorium
September 25, 2012	Denver	United States	Fillmore Auditorium
September 27, 2012	Flagstaff	United States	Orpheum Theater
September 28, 2012	Tempe	United States	Tempe Beach Park
September 29, 2012	Anaheim	United States	Honda Center
October 1, 2012	Paradise	United States	The Joint
October 2, 2012	Reno	United States	Grand Sierra Resort Theatre
October 4, 2012	Victoria	Canada	Save-On-Foods Memorial Centre
October 6, 2012	Calgary	Canada	BMO Centre
October 7, 2012	Edmonton	Canada	Edmonton Expo Centre
South America, Leg #2
November 3, 2012	São Paulo	Brazil	WROS Fest
November 4, 2012	São Paulo	Brazil	WROS Fest
November 7, 2012	Buenos Aires	Argentina	WROS Fest
November 9, 2012	Santiago	Chile	WROS Fest
Central America
November 11, 2012	San José	Costa Rica	Pepper Club
North America (Special dates)
November 30, 2012	Lake Buena Vista	United States	House of Blues
December 1, 2012	St. Petersburg	United States	97X Next Big Thing
December 2, 2012	Jacksonville	United States	The Big Ticket
Africa
March 9, 2013	Cape Town	South Africa	RAMfest
March 16, 2013	Johannesburg	South Africa	Riversands Farm
Europe As part of the Vans Warped Tour 2013
November 16, 2013	London	United Kingdom	Alexandra Palace

== Support acts ==
- A Day to Remember (January 17–February 5, 2012; April 15–May 10, 2012)
- AbraSKAdabra (February 25, 2011)
- Antillectual (August 13, 2011)
- Architects (February 28–March 10, 15–20, 2012)
- Authority Zero (September 27, 2012)
- Bad Religion (April 5–May 14, 2011)
- Berri Txarrak (February 25–27, 2011)
- Break Even (July 14–23, 2011)
- Coliseum (March 11–27, 2011)
- Descendents (April 7, 2011)
- Four Year Strong (April 5–May 14, 2011)
- Flogging Molly (September 30–October 12, 2011)
- Gallows (June 12–14, 2012; June 19, 2012)
- Glassjaw (February 3, 2012)
- Hot Water Music (September 11–13, 2012; September 16–25; 2012; September 28–October 7, 2012)
- Good Intentions (February 26, 2011)
- The Vandals (September 9, 2012)
- NOFX (September 21, 2012)
- Polar Bear Club (November 2–15, 2011)
- Port (812) (March 12, 2012)
- Sick of It All (July 14–23, 2011)
- Shameless Losers (February 27, 2011)
- T-34 (March 13, 2012)
- Templeton Pek (August 13–15, 23, 2011)
- The Black Pacific (September 27–October 12, 2011)
- The Bronx (September 14–26, 2011)
- The Gaslight Anthem (September 11–13, 2012; September 16–20, 2012; September 24–25, 2012; September 28–October 7, 2012)
- The Menzingers (January 17–February 5, 2012)
- The Vandals (September 9, 2012)
- Title Fight (April 15–May 10, 2012)
- Tom Morello: The Nightwatchman (November 2–13, 2011)
- Touché Amoré (February 28–March 10, 15–20, 2012)

== As a support act ==
- Foo Fighters (September 14–26, 2011)

== Personnel ==
- Tim McIlrath – lead vocals, rhythm guitar
- Zach Blair – lead guitar, backing vocals
- Joe Principe – bass guitar, backing vocals
- Brandon Barnes – drums, percussion

== Songs played ==
=== From The Unraveling ===
- Alive and Well
- Six Ways 'Til Sunday
- Remains of Summer Memories
- Stained Glass and Marble
- Everchanging

=== From Revolutions per Minute ===
- Heaven Knows
- Like the Angel
- Blood-Red, White & Blue
- Broken English
- Torches

=== From Siren Song of the Counter Culture ===
- State of the Union
- Paper Wings
- Blood to Bleed
- Give It All
- Swing Life Away

=== From The Sufferer & the Witness ===
- Chamber the Cartridge
- Injection
- Ready to Fall
- Prayer of the Refugee
- Drones
- Behind Closed Doors
- The Good Left Undone
- Survive

=== From Appeal to Reason ===
- Collapse (Post-Amerika)
- Long Forgotten Sons
- Re-Education (Through Labor)
- The Dirt Whispered
- From Heads Unworthy
- The Strength to Go On
- Audience of One
- Entertainment
- Hero of War
- Savior

=== From Endgame ===
- Architects
- Help Is on the Way
- Make It Stop (September's Children)
- Disparity By Design
- Satellite
- Midnight Hands
- Survivor Guilt
- Broken Mirrors
- Wait for Me
