= The Sufferer & the Witness =

Studio album by Rise Against
- Released: July 4, 2006
- Recorded: January–April 2006
- Studio: The Blasting Room (Fort Collins, Colorado)
- Genres: Melodic hardcore; punk rock
- Length: 42:37
- Label: Geffen
- Producers: Bill Stevenson; Jason Livermore

Rise Against chronology
| Siren Song of the Counter Culture (2004) | The Sufferer & the Witness (2006) | Appeal to Reason (2008) |

Singles from The Sufferer & the Witness
- 1. "Ready to Fall" Released: May 30, 2006; 2. "Prayer of the Refugee" Released: December 7, 2006; 3. "The Good Left Undone" Released: May 22, 2007

The Sufferer & the Witness is the fourth studio album by American punk rock band Rise Against, released on July 4, 2006. A melodic hardcore album, it comprises thirteen tracks that focus on melody, catchy hooks, and rapid-paced tempo. Social and political issues as well as the concept of self-reflection constitute the majority of the lyrical content.

Dissatisfied with Siren Song of the Counter Culture's (2004) producer Garth Richardson, the band members decided to record their next album with Bill Stevenson and Jason Livermore, the duo that worked on their 2003 album Revolutions per Minute. The Sufferer & the Witness sold 48,327 copies in its first week of release, and charted in seven countries, including the United States where it entered at position ten on the Billboard 200. Critical appraisal was mainly positive, with reviewers complimenting Rise Against's ability to mature in its sound while simultaneously retain its punk roots. Reviewers also highlighted the vocals of singer Tim McIlrath and the production of Stevenson and Livermore.

Three songs from The Sufferer & the Witness were released as singles: "Ready to Fall", "Prayer of the Refugee", and "The Good Left Undone". All three songs charted on the Modern Rock Tracks chart in the United States, and accompanying music videos were produced. Rise Against supported the album with The Sufferer & the Witness Tour throughout the second half of 2006 and all of 2007. It is the band's first album not to feature a new guitarist, as Chris Chasse remained with Rise Against after their previous release; however, this album ended up being their last to feature him, as he left the band during the tour and was replaced by Zach Blair.

== Background and production ==
In August 2004, Rise Against released its major record label debut album Siren Song of the Counter Culture. A sleeper hit in the United States, it was certified gold by the Recording Industry Association of America, denoting shipments of 500,000 copies. Siren Song of the Counter Culture's success was largely due to the breakthrough single "Swing Life Away", an acoustic ballad that starkly contrasted the band's typical hardcore oeuvre. To promote the album, Rise Against embarked on an extensive touring schedule that concluded in December 2005. The next month, the band members reconvened and began work on their fourth album The Sufferer & the Witness.

During the recording sessions for Siren Song of the Counter Culture, the band members became dissatisfied with the contributions from producer Garth Richardson, as he did not fully understand their musical background in punk rock. Richardson was better known for his work with heavier-sounding bands like Mudvayne and Rage Against the Machine, and as a result, the album sounded more polished and heavier than Rise Against's previous raw material. Combined with the numerous distractions and inconveniences that plagued the recording sessions, lead vocalist Tim McIlrath views Siren Song of the Counter Culture as the album that "got away from us". When it came time to record The Sufferer & the Witness, the band members decided to return to Bill Stevenson and Jason Livermore, who produced their 2003 album Revolutions per Minute. The members developed a strong rapport with the duo while recording that album, particularly Stevenson, whom McIlrath described as their "musical soul mate".

By December 2005, five songs had been written for The Sufferer & the Witness. The rest of the songs were written in January 2006, in a practice space in West Side, Chicago. McIlrath noted that the band procrastinated writing the songs for several weeks, leaving them with only a three-week period to write the entire album. The band was not affected by this added pressure however; according to McIlrath: "It went great, the songs just flowed out of us. There were really few questions and the song lyrics would just come out of us, it went really well and everyone really liked them." Unlike the stressful recording sessions for Siren Song of the Counter Culture, the band members had a much more enjoyable time with The Sufferer & the Witness, as they no longer sought the approval of their parent company Geffen Records.

== Composition ==
=== Music ===
For The Sufferer & the Witness, Rise Against's members sought to return to their punk roots. McIlrath commented: "It's definitely more of a punk rock record...We haven't 'grown or matured' as such, we've just really executed what we've been trying to nail with the last few records." Critics have characterized the album's music as melodic hardcore. Many of the album's songs focus on melody, catchy hooks, and rapid-paced tempo; to this extent, Corey Apar of AllMusic wrote, "this record is basically one shout-along, mosh-worthy song after another".

The opening song "Chamber the Cartridge" begins with a marching drum beat, while "Injection" uses double time tempo and a driving guitar riff. "Ready to Fall" features a complex song structure, with controlled verses that lead into an intense chorus and screaming vocals, while a continuous bassline plays in the background. The fourth song, "Bricks", is only ninety seconds long, and is played at a frenetic pace with influences of hardcore punk. "Prayer of the Refugee" uses a similar structure to "Ready to Fall", as slow verses are contrasted with more upbeat choruses; it includes one of the few instances of a guitar solo on the album, which is played during the bridge. "Drones" features what PopMatters' Will Rausch describes as a "mile-a-minute mentality", a rapidly-paced song fused with rolling basslines.

The eighth song, "The Approaching Curve", is one of the two major stylistic deviations on the album. McIlrath delivers spoken word lyrics during the verses, and switches to singing during the chorus. Emily Schambra of the band Holy Roman Empire provides backing vocals. "Worth Dying For" features a different verse-chorus form than previous songs, as the uptempo verse section contrasts the slow and methodical chorus. "Roadside" is another stylistic deviation, as it pairs undistored guitars with a piano and minimal string instrumentation. Schambra provides backing vocals for this song as well. "The Good Left Undone" returns to a faster pace, and has been described as an "anthemic" song. The final song, "Survive", begins with a moody guitar riff and crashing cymbals, before transitioning into rapid-paced drumming and guitar shredding.

=== Lyrics ===
"Prayer of the Refugee"
Much of the lyrical content on The Sufferer & the Witness centers around social issues. For example, "Prayer of the Refugee" is about forced displacement and the strife of refugees.

Social and political issues, namely injustice, constitute much of the lyrical content on The Sufferer & the Witness. The lyrics often discuss these topics in general terms, instead of delving into the specifics. According to McIlrath: "I think that a lot of the problems we deal with today in the world are the ones that have been plaguing society for centuries and probably will be here a hundred years from now...There's a bigger picture than just the Bush administration and specific problems of 2006, and I want people to relate to that, even if they're listening to it 10 years from now." This style of songwriting is seen in "Chamber the Cartridge", which rallies against apathy toward any societal issue, and "Bricks", which deals with war and resistance in universal terms.

Another major lyrical theme revolves around the concept of self-reflection. "Worth Dying For" is about the frustrating search for a worthwhile cause, while "The Approaching Curve" and "Roadside" discuss the impact of troubled relationships. Some songs on the album use metaphors to further the lyrical narrative. "Injection" compares an everlasting love for someone to pharmaceutical drugs, while the bar fight setting in "Behind Closed Doors" is used to demonstrate man's inhumanity to one another. Despite the grim subject matter, the album's lyrics are often hopeful in nature. This is best exemplified in "Survive", with its uplifting and motivational lyrics such as "we've all been sorry, we've all been hurt...but how we survive is what makes us who we are".

== Release ==
The Sufferer & the Witness was originally scheduled for a June 20 release, although this date was pushed back to July 4. This new date coincided with Independence Day in the United States, which McIlrath noted was purely coincidental. In the United States, the album entered the Billboard 200 at number ten, and sold 48,327 copies in its first week. It sold over 140,000 copies by August 2006, and was certified gold by the Recording Industry Association of America in August 2008. In Canada, the album debuted at number five on the Canadian Albums Chart, and was certified platinum by Music Canada, denoting shipments of 100,000 copies.

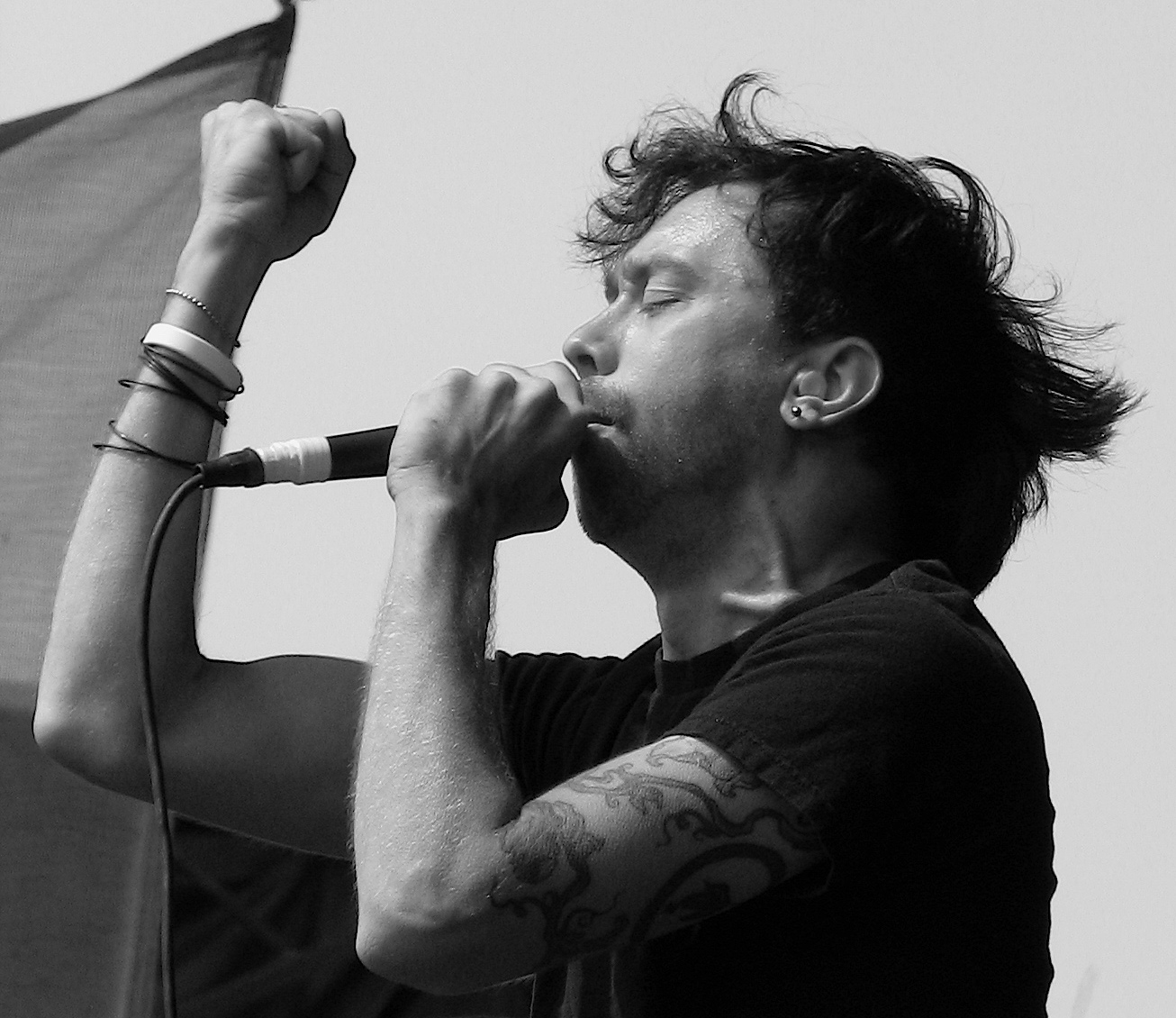
McIlrath performing with Rise Against during the 2006 Warped Tour in Vancouver

The Sufferer & the Witness was Rise Against's first album to chart in countries outside of North America. The album peaked at number twenty-one in Australia, and was certified gold by the Australian Recording Industry Association, denoting shipments of 35,000 copies. It was similarly certified gold by Bundesverband Musikindustrie for shipping 100,000 copies in Germany. In the UK, it peaked at number 171 on the UK Albums Chart and sold 58,243 copies by June 2017, and was eventually certified silver by the British Phonographic Industry. The album also reached number seventy-five in Austria and number ninety-eight in Switzerland.

Three songs from The Sufferer & the Witness were released as singles: "Ready to Fall", "Prayer of the Refugee", and "The Good Left Undone". All three singles charted on the Modern Rock Tracks chart, peaking at number thirteen, seven, and six respectively. Accompanying music videos were shot for all three songs. The "Ready to Fall" video deals with animal rights and deforestation, and uses footage from the 2005 documentary film Earthlings. In the video for "Prayer of the Refugee", the band performs in a retail store, with intermittent shots of foreign workers making the store products. By contrast, the video for "The Good Left Undone" does not have a political message. It features the band performing underground in the dirt, and was their first video to use computer graphics.

Rise Against supported the album with The Sufferer & the Witness Tour throughout the second half of 2006 and all of 2007. The band was a headliner on the 2006 Warped Tour in North America, and in late 2006, the band co-headlined a tour with Thursday which included the bands Circa Survive and Billy Talent. While on the Warped Tour, author and filmmaker Davy Rothbart recorded several of the band's live performances, and interviewed some of their fans. This footage was used in the Rise Against DVD documentary Generation Lost. The following year, Rise Against participated in Taste of Chaos 2007, and supported My Chemical Romance as openers on the first half of their arena tour. Prior to the tour with My Chemical Romance, guitarist Chris Chasse left the band, citing a rigorous tour schedule as the reason for his departure. Zach Blair of the band Only Crime joined Rise Against soon afterward.

== Reception ==
Professional ratings
Review scores
| Source | Rating |
|---|---|
| AbsolutePunk | 84% |
| AllMusic | 4/5 stars |
| Alternative Press | 4/5 stars |
| The A.V. Club | B |
| Entertainment Weekly | B+ |
| PopMatters | 8/10 stars |
| Rolling Stone | 3.5/5 stars |
| Spin | 3/5 stars |
| Sputnikmusic | 5/5 stars |

Critical appraisal was mainly positive, with several critics highlighting the music as the album's strongest component. Corey Apar of AllMusic praised the music's "sincerity and passion" and described it as "maturing within the realms of major-label hardcore revivalism, while still remaining relevant and exciting". Davey Boy of Sputnikmusic noted that it was the first album he ever gave a perfect score, stating that "Possibly the best thing about it is how Rise Against have achieved the difficult task of not selling out their origins, yet furthering all facets of their music to become a little more mainstream." The Dallas Morning News gave a more negative review. Critic Mike Daniel wrote how the songs lacked definition, the in-song transitions were awkward, and the distortion often overshadowed McIlrath's vocals.

The two songs with major stylistic deviations—"The Approaching Curve" and "Roadside"—were thoroughly discussed by critics. Punknews' Aubin Paul wrote that "The Approaching Curve" had powerful choruses and a tight instrumental section, while Boy said the spoken word lyrics perfectly emphasized the melodic chorus. Rausch disagreed with these assessments, calling the song "less than effective". Rausch did appreciate "Roadside", as did Boy, who felt Schambra's backing vocals made the song more compelling. Scott Heisel of Alternative Press noted similarities between "Roadside" and "Outside" by Staind.

McIlrath's vocals were praised by several critics. Rausch commented he was able to alternate between singing and screaming on key, while Paul felt his voice conveyed abject despondency and earnest hope. Other critics agreed with Paul's assessment, calling McIlrath's vocal delivery "palpable", "passionate", and "ragged". Boy felt that the minimal use of screaming vocals heightened their overall impact, and noted that listeners who do not like screaming will still enjoy the album. By contrast, Christine Leonard of Fast Forward Weekly felt that McIlrath's harsh vocals undermined the political lyrics more than accentuated them.

Discussing the lyrics, Boy felt they were simple and to the point, but ultimately effective, while Ryan found the conflict-laden imagery redundant. Ryan noted: "McIlrath's thematic heavy-handedness is nothing new, but it'd be nice to see less obvious terms." Several critics highlighted the production of Stevenson and Livermore. In particular, Paul wrote: "It's flawlessly recorded, but never sterile, and in many ways, Stevenson demonstrates how he is really the fifth member of any band he produces...Listening to Sufferer, it becomes clear how wrong any other producer would be for this band".

== Track listing ==
All lyrics written by Tim McIlrath; all music composed by Rise Against, unless otherwise noted.

| No. | Title | Length |
|---|---|---|
| 1. | "Chamber the Cartridge" | 3:35 |
| 2. | "Injection" | 3:19 |
| 3. | "Ready to Fall" | 3:47 |
| 4. | "Bricks" | 1:30 |
| 5. | "Under the Knife" | 2:45 |
| 6. | "Prayer of the Refugee" | 3:21 |
| 7. | "Drones" | 3:01 |
| 8. | "The Approaching Curve" | 3:44 |
| 9. | "Worth Dying For" | 3:20 |
| 10. | "Behind Closed Doors" | 3:15 |
| 11. | "Roadside" | 3:21 |
| 12. | "The Good Left Undone" | 4:10 |
| 13. | "Survive" | 3:40 |
| Total length: | | 42:37 |

The Sufferer & the Witness – UK edition
| No. | Title | Length |
|---|---|---|
| 14. | "Built to Last" (Sick of It All cover) | 1:53 |

The Sufferer & the Witness – Australian edition
| No. | Title | Length |
|---|---|---|
| 14. | "Built to Last" (Sick of It All cover) | 1:53 |

The Sufferer & the Witness – 7" edition
| No. | Title | Length |
|---|---|---|
| 14. | "But Tonight We Dance" | 2:48 |

The Sufferer & the Witness – Australian Tour edition
| No. | Title | Length |
|---|---|---|
| 14. | "Boy's No Good" (Lifetime cover) | 1:18 |
| 15. | "But Tonight We Dance" | 2:48 |
| 16. | "Like the Angel" (Warped Tour 2006 version) | 3:08 |
| 17. | "State of the Union" (Warped Tour 2006 version) | 2:40 |
| 18. | "Dancing for Rain" (Warped Tour 2006 version) | 3:28 |
| 19. | "Everchanging" (acoustic version) | 4:21 |

== Personnel ==
Credits adapted from the liner notes of The Sufferer & the Witness.

Rise Against

- Tim McIlrath – lead vocals, rhythm guitar
- Joe Principe – bass guitar, backing vocals
- Chris Chasse – lead guitar, backing vocals
- Brandon Barnes – drums, percussion

Additional musicians

- Chad Price – backing vocals
- Emily Schambra – guest vocals on "The Approaching Curve", "Roadside", and "But Tonight We Dance"
- Andrea Glass – cello

Artwork

- JP Robinson and Todd Russell – art direction and album design
- Andrew Zbihlyj – illustration
- Stacie Stevenson – photography

Production

- Bill Stevenson – production, engineering
- Jason Livermore – production, engineering
- Andrew Berlin – additional engineering
- Johnny Schou – additional engineering
- Chris Lord-Alge – mixing
- Ted Jensen – mastering
- Andrew Berlin, Christopher Jak, and Johnny Schou – piano arrangement

Managerial

- Missy Worth – management for Artistic License
- Corrie Christopher – booking agent for The Agency Group
- Marlene Tsucii – international booking agent for Creative Artists Agency
- Paul Orescan – marketing
- Stacy Fass – legal
- Cliff Feiman – production manager

== Charts and certifications ==
| Chart (2006) | Peak position |
|---|---|
| Australian Albums (ARIA) | 21 |
| Austrian Albums (Ö3 Austria) | 75 |
| Canadian Albums (Billboard) | 5 |
| German Albums (Offizielle Top 100) | 77 |
| Swiss Albums (Schweizer Hitparade) | 98 |
| UK Albums (OCC) | 171 |
| US Billboard 200 | 10 |

| Region | Certification | Certified units/sales |
|---|---|---|
| Australia (ARIA) | Gold | 35,000^{^} |
| Canada (Music Canada) | Platinum | 100,000^{^} |
| Germany (BVMI) | Gold | 100,000^{^} |
| United Kingdom (BPI) | Silver | 60,000^{‡} |
| United States (RIAA) | Platinum | 1,000,000^{‡} |
Summaries
^{^} Shipments figures based on certification alone.^{‡} Sales+streaming figures based on certification alone.
