= Brandon Barnes =

American drummer (born 1978)

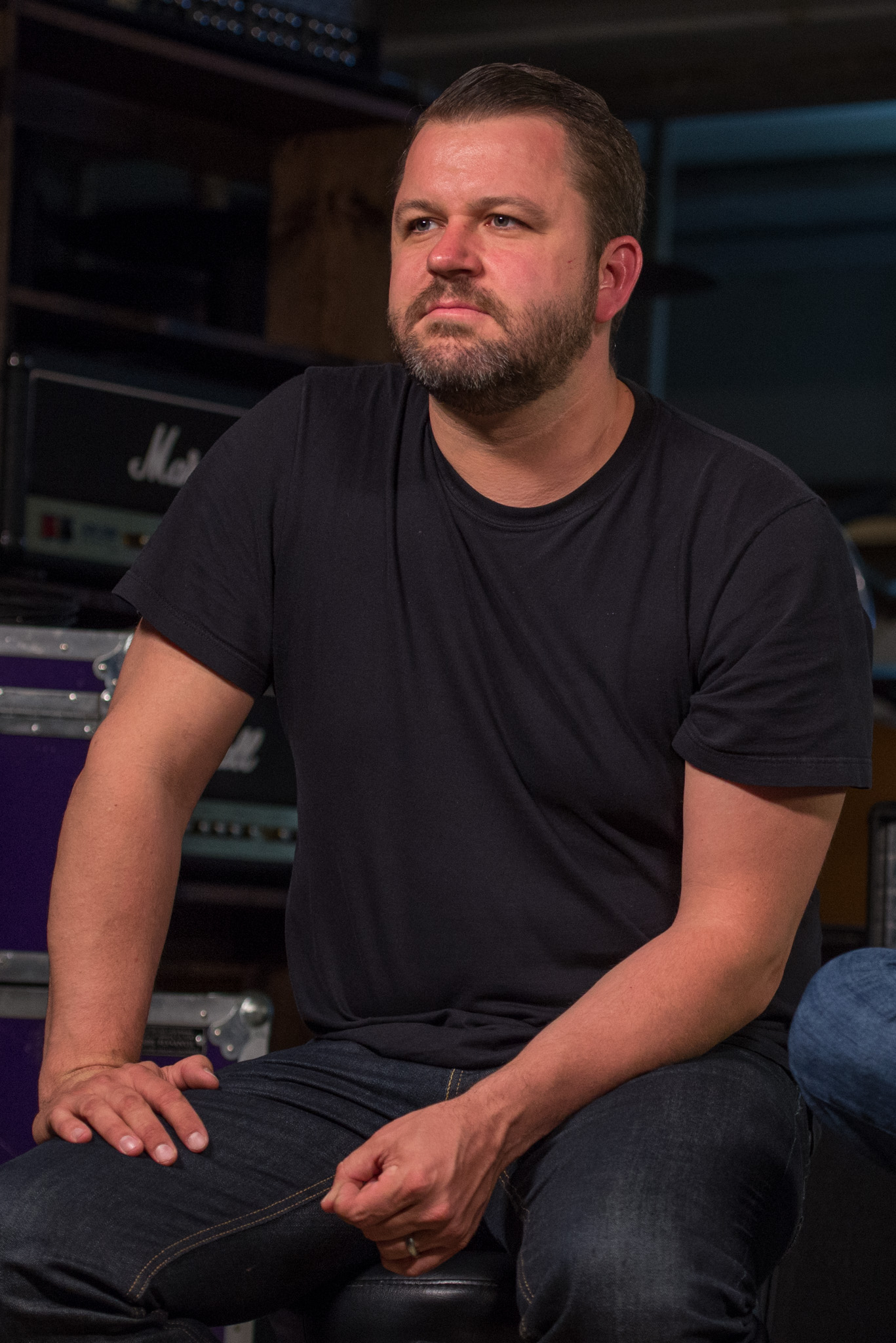
- Barnes in 2015

Background information
- Born: October 10, 1978 (age 47); Conifer, Colorado, U.S.
- Genres: Melodic hardcore; punk rock; hardcore punk
- Occupation: Drummer
- Years active: 1993–present
- Website: riseagainst.com

Brandon Barnes (born October 10, 1978) is an American musician, best known as the drummer for the punk rock band Rise Against.

== Biography ==
Barnes received his first drum set when he was nine years old from his grandfather, who was a jazz musician in Chicago. He started drum lessons when he was twelve until he was seventeen, he also joined a jazz band in high school. He studied music in college and played drums in the University of Colorado music program. He knew then he wanted to make music his career. By listening to his favorite drummers such as Elvin Jones, Tony Williams, Terry Bozzio, Peter Erskine, and Dave Lombardo, Barnes developed the style of playing he has used in many bands over the last 10 years.

Barnes is also a strict vegetarian, an animal rights advocate and actively promotes PETA with his band.

== Career ==
=== Pinhead Circus (1999) ===
Pinhead Circus formed in 1988 with Jimmy Pinhead, guitarist, Trevor, bassist, and Otis as the drummer. In 1997 the band caught their attention of BYO Records and released their first album, Detailed Instructions for the Self Involved, later that year. Barnes joined Pinhead Circus in 1999 after their drummer Otis left. Pinhead then released their second album, Everything Else Is Just a Far Gone Conclusion in 1999 through BYO Records. Soon after, Barnes split the band before joining Rise Against in 2000.

=== Rise Against (2000–present) ===
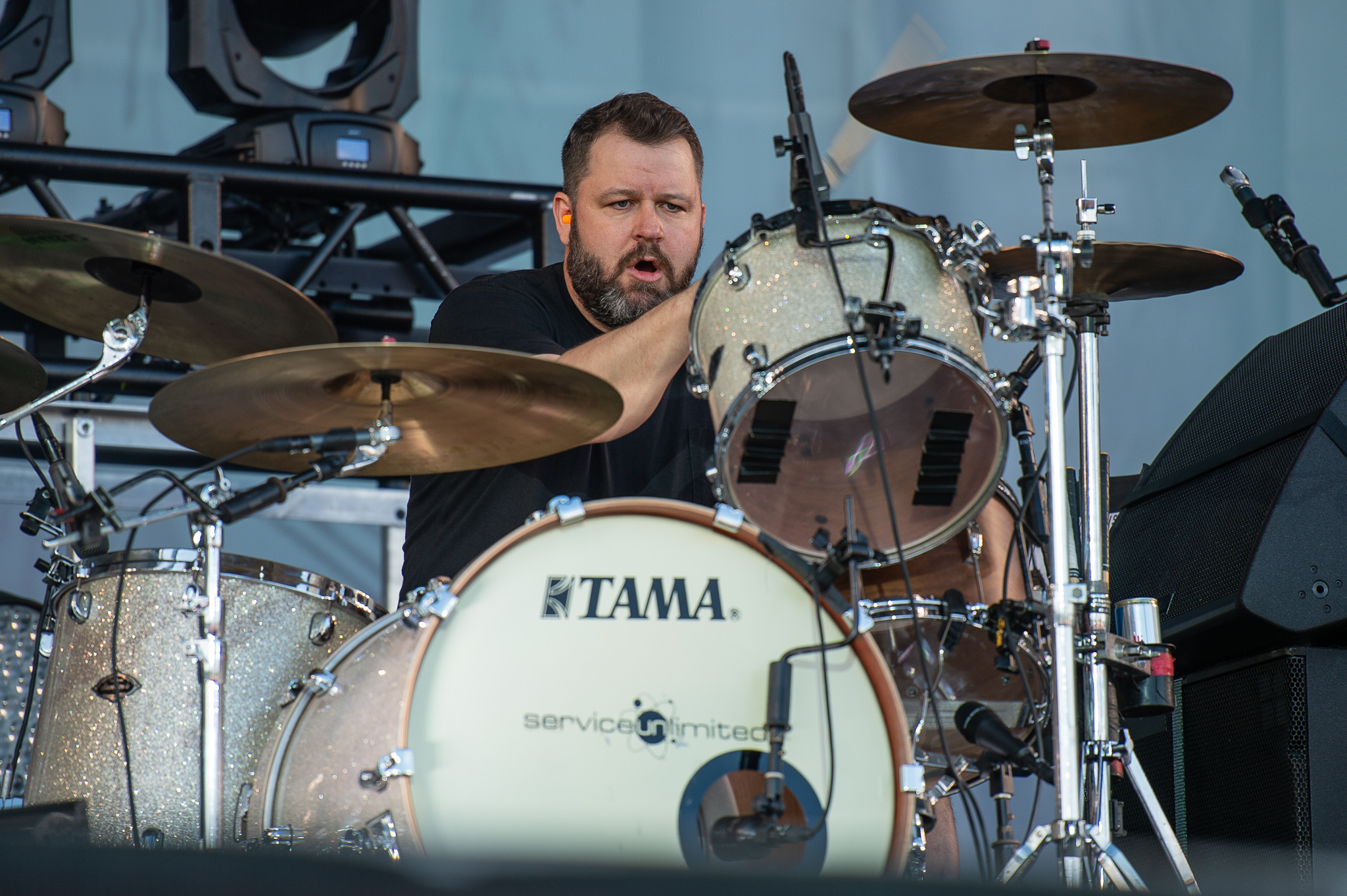
Barnes with Rise Against in 2018

After leaving his previous band "Pinhead Circus" Barnes joined Rise Against in 2000 after their drummer, Dan Lumley left and he was then asked to join the band. The band then signed with Fat Wreck Chords in 2001. They then released their debut album The Unraveling and spent the rest of the year touring. The band returned to the studio in December 2002 to work on their second full-length, Revolutions Per Minute in 2003 and toured for 2003's Warped Tour, which gained the band some success. Rise Against then signed to DreamWorks Records in late 2003 to begin the recording of their third record, but DreamWorks was shortly absorbed by the Universal Music Group, and Rise Against found itself with major label Geffen Records. Todd Mohney, the band's guitarist at the time left and was replaced by Chris Chasse and began the recording of the new album Siren Song of the Counter Culture. Siren Song of the Counter Culture was released on August 10, 2004, peaking at number 136 on the Billboard 200 album charts, gaining the band major success with the singles "Give It All, "Swing Life Away", and "Life Less Frightening".

The band re-entered the studio in January 2006, after touring in support of Siren Song of the Counter Culture, Rise Against recorded their fourth studio album at the Blasting Room studio in Fort Collins, Colorado with producers Bill Stevenson and Jason Livermore. The Sufferer & the Witness was released on July 4, 2006, peaking at number 10 on the Billboard 200 and received generally positive reviews from critics and was a commercial success along with their singles "Ready to Fall", "Prayer of the Refugee" and "The Good Left Undone". Rise Against toured in support of The Sufferer & the Witness throughout the second half of 2006 and all of 2007. The band was a headliner in the 2006 Warped Tour as part of The Sufferer & the Witness Tour. In late 2006, the band co-headlined a tour with Thursday that included the bands Circa Survive and Billy Talent. The Sufferer & the Witness has less of the hardcore punk feel from the band's previous album. In 2007 Chasse decided to leave the band and was replaced by longtime friend Zach Blair from Only Crime. During this tour, on July 3, 2007, Rise Against released an EP in Canada titled This Is Noise, which was subsequently released in the United States on January 15, 2008.

Rise Against's fifth studio album Appeal to Reason was released on October 4 in Australia, October 6 across Europe, and October 7 in the United States. The album sold 64,700 copies in its first week and peaked at number 3 on the Billboard 200, making it Rise Against's highest-charting album to date. Appeal to Reason was met with generally positive reviews. Rise Against embarked on a North American tour with bands Rancid, Billy Talent, Killswitch Engage, and Riverboat Gamblers in June and July 2009.

After touring for almost two years Rise Against had begun recording their sixth studio album for a 2011 release, at the Blasting Room in Fort Collins, Colorado. Rise Against has announced two South American shows in Brazil and Argentina and a run of European shows in late February and March 2011 respectively. Endgame was released on March 11, 2011, in the United States peaking at number 2 on the Billboard 200, receiving positive reviews from critics and commercial success in the United States and Canada, along with the band's three previous albums. After touring South America, and Europe, Rise Against will tour the United States in April in support of the Endgame Tour, with Bad Religion, and Four Year Strong in the support of the tour.

== Drum equipment ==
Drums
Tama

- 8"x14" S.L.P.G-Maple Snare
- 9"x12" Tom Tom
- 16"x16" Floor Tom
- 18"x22" Bass Drum

Hardware
Tama

- Iron Cobra Power Glide Single Pedal
- Iron Cobra Lever Glide Hi-Hat Stand

Cymbals
Sabian

- 15" AAX X-Celerator Hats
- 22" Paragon Ride
- 18" HHX Evolution Crash
- 19" AAX Virgil Donati Saturation Crash
- 20" Paragon Crash

Sticks
Vic Firth Drumsticks

- Vic Firth Christoph Schneider signature model with Pro-Mark Stick Rapp

== Discography ==
=== Pinhead Circus ===
- Everything Else Is Just a Far Gone Conclusion (1999)

=== Rise Against ===
- The Unraveling (2001)
- Revolutions Per Minute (2003)
- Siren Song of the Counter Culture (2004)
- The Sufferer & the Witness (2006)
- This Is Noise (2007)
- Appeal to Reason (2008)
- Endgame (2011)
- The Black Market (2014)
- Wolves (2017)
- Nowhere Generation (2021)
- Nowhere Generation II (2022)
- Ricochet (2025)
