= Le Trabendo =

Coordinates: 48.892578°N 2.393893°E

Le Trabendo is a concert venue located at the Parc de la Villette, in the 19th arrondissement of Paris, France. It has a capacity of 700.
