= Ready to Fall =

2006 single by Rise Against

Single by Rise Against

from the album The Sufferer & the Witness
- B-side: "State of the Union" (live)
- Released: May 30, 2006
- Studio: The Blasting Room (Fort Collins, Colorado)
- Genre: Hardcore punk; melodic hardcore
- Length: 3:48
- Label: Geffen
- Songwriter: Rise Against
- Producers: Bill Stevenson; Jason Livermore

Rise Against singles chronology
"Life Less Frightening" (2005)	"Ready to Fall" (2006)	"Prayer of the Refugee" (2006)

"Ready to Fall" is the first single by the punk rock band Rise Against from their fourth studio album, The Sufferer & the Witness (2006).

An acoustic version of this song was performed live on the CJZN Radio station in Victoria, British Columbia, on January 18, 2007, before a Billy Talent concert featuring Rise Against, Anti-Flag, and Moneen.

== Composition and reception ==
"Ready to Fall" was the first single from The Sufferer & The Witness, Rise Against's follow-up to its 2004 breakthrough album Siren Song of the Counter Culture For The Sufferer & the Witness, Rise Against's members sought to return to their punk roots. McIlrath commented: "It's definitely more of a punk rock record ... We haven't 'grown or matured' as such, we've just really executed what we've been trying to nail with the last few records." Like most of the songs from The Sufferer & The Witness, "Ready to Fall" is characterized as hardcore punk and melodic hardcore, with a midtempo beat. "Ready to Fall" features a complex song structure, with controlled verses that lead into an intense chorus and screaming vocals, while a continuous bassline plays in the background. The vocals and instrumentation are noticeably heavier than most of the songs on the album.

"Ready to Fall" was released on May 30, as the first single from The Sufferer & The Witness. It was released as a CD and 7" single; the B-side features a live performance of "State of the Union", take from the album Siren Song of the Counter Culture. Commercially, "Ready to Fall" peaked at number thirteen on the Billboard Alternative Songs chart, the bands' highest charting single at the time.

"Ready to Fall" received positive reviews from critics, several of whom described the chorus as "compelling". Davey Boy of Sputnikmusic further praised the song for its controlled verses and intense bridge. Scott Heisel of Alternative Press and Corey Apar of AllMusic noted how "Ready to Fall" emulated Rise Against's older style of music. Heisel in particular said the song was "guaranteed to start circle pits wherever played".

== Music video ==
The accompanying music video, released in May of 2006, was directed by Kevin Kerslake. Much of the footage used in the video is from the documentary Earthlings. The video was filmed at Brandywine Falls Provincial Park in British Columbia. Running at 3 minutes and 51 seconds long, it cuts between shots of the band playing, wild animals, and footage related to pollution, environmental destruction, and animal rights. Similar environmental concerns, such as mining, forest clearing, desertification, oil, and melting of polar ice, as well as animals who are dead or dying as a result of those practices are depicted, and footage of hunters, rodeos, animal experimentation, the capture and slaughter of wild dolphins, and animals in captivity is also displayed. Finally, it features video from several areas of animal agriculture including eggs, fishing, and meat. At the end of the video, lead singer Tim McIlrath says, "Every action has a reaction. We've got one planet, one chance." Another, more graphic, 'uncut' version of the video was created, but was never officially released due to its graphic nature, but is available on certain websites such as Vimeo. The video focuses more on animal rights and serves a testimony to veganism.

Rise Against is an active supporter of PETA, an animal rights organization, and the band members are all active vegetarians. Some cutscenes, such as the traffic scene and the napalm exploding, were also featured in the Linkin Park music video for "What I've Done".

== Credits and personnel ==
Credits adapted from the liner notes of The Sufferer & the Witness.

=== Rise Against ===
- Tim McIlrath – lead vocals, rhythm guitar
- Chris Chasse – lead guitar, backing vocals
- Joe Principe – bass guitar, backing vocals
- Brandon Barnes – drums

Additional personnel

- Chad Price – backing vocals

=== Production ===
- Bill Stevenson, Jason Livermore – producers
- Bill Stevenson, Jason Livermore – audio engineering
- Chris Lord-Alge – mixing
- Ted Jensen – mastering

== Chart performance ==
Chart (2006)	Peak position
Canada Rock (Billboard)	50
UK Rock & Metal (Official Charts)	6
US Alternative Airplay (Billboard)	13
