= Siren Song of the Counter Culture =

2004 studio album by Rise Against

Studio album by Rise Against
- Released: August 10, 2004
- Studios: Plumper Mountain Sound (Gibsons, British Columbia); The Warehouse Studio (Vancouver, British Columbia); Gravity Studios (Chicago)
- Genre: Melodic hardcore
- Length: 40:54
- Label: Geffen
- Producer: Garth Richardson

Rise Against chronology
Revolutions per Minute (2003)	Siren Song of the Counter Culture (2004)	The Sufferer & the Witness (2006)

Singles from Siren Song of the Counter Culture
- 1. "Give It All" Released: October 12, 2004; 2. "Swing Life Away" Released: April 26, 2005; 3. "Life Less Frightening" Released: November 28, 2005

Siren Song of the Counter Culture is the third studio album by American punk rock band Rise Against. Released on August 10, 2004, it was Rise Against's first album on a major record label, after the band signed with DreamWorks Records in September 2003 and is their first with lead guitarist Chris Chasse. The recording sessions for the album with producer Garth Richardson were mostly split between two studios in British Columbia. These sessions were marred by numerous distractions and inconveniences, such as the absorption of DreamWorks into Geffen Records, the arrival of a new guitarist, accusations of the band selling out, and the birth of lead vocalist Tim McIlrath's child.

Siren Song of the Counter Culture is primarily a melodic hardcore album. It comprises twelve songs, with lyrical themes ranging from social commentary to personal reflection. To promote the album, Rise Against toured throughout North America, Europe, Australia, and Japan. Siren Song of the Counter Culture sold poorly for the first six months, but the band's incessant touring schedule eventually led to a gradual increase in sales. It became their first album to chart on the Billboard 200, where it peaked at number 136, and was certified gold by the Recording Industry Association of America.

The album received generally positive reviews, with praise for the lyrics, but drew some criticism for a lack of individually memorable songs and perceived overproduction. Three songs from Siren Song of the Counter Culture were released as singles: "Give It All", "Swing Life Away", and "Life Less Frightening". All three songs charted on the Modern Rock Tracks chart. "Give It All" and "Swing Life Away" in particular are credited with helping Rise Against achieve mainstream appeal.

== Background and recording ==
After the release of Revolutions per Minute in 2003, a number of major record labels became interested in Rise Against, including DreamWorks Records. At the time, Rise Against was under contract with the independent record label Fat Wreck Chords. The general consensus among Fat Wreck Chords musicians was that major record labels sacrifice musical integrity in exchange for commercial profit. Rise Against held the same belief, but eventually came to the conclusion that, unlike other labels, DreamWorks supported the band's social and political charged lyrics. According to lead vocalist Tim McIlrath: "Their faith in what we do and the fact that they cared about stuff we cared about was an eye-opener." The band signed with DreamWorks in September 2003, and was given complete creative control to record Siren Song of the Counter Culture.

The band members went into the album with the assumption that DreamWorks was going to drop them at any moment, so they wanted to take advantage of the opportunity by working with their "dream producer". They chose Garth Richardson, known for his work with heavier sounding bands like Rage Against the Machine and Sick of It All, to produce the album. The recording sessions for Siren Song of the Counter Culture were split between Plumper Mountain Sound in Gibsons, British Columbia, and The Warehouse Studio in Vancouver, British Columbia. Richardson insisted on recording the guitar and bass one measure at a time, to ensure perfect timing; as a result, each song took nearly twelve hours to record. Canadian politician Nicholas Simons contributed the cello to four songs. Simons met the band while in Gibsons, and recalled not knowing who they were.

The writing and recording sessions for Siren Song of the Counter Culture were marred by numerous distractions and inconveniences. In November 2003, DreamWorks was acquired by Universal Music Group for US$100 million, and eventually folded into Geffen Records. The transition period between labels left Rise Against without an A&R representative, and little acknowledgement from Geffen executives. Guitarist Todd Mohney left the band during the writing sessions, was replaced by Chris Chasse of Reach the Sky. McIlrath noted that the band members was nervous about teaching Chasse completely new songs in a short period. Meanwhile, McIlrath was experiencing more personal distractions. Some Rise Against fans accused the band of selling out after signing with DreamWorks. Although McIlrath felt that most of the fans would realize that the band had not changed upon hearing the album, it still bothered him knowing that some longtime fans now hated the band for switching labels. Additionally, McIlrath's wife, who was seven months pregnant, went into labor while he was in the vocal booth. The band temporarily moved recording sessions from Vancouver to Chicago so that McIlrath could be with his wife.

== Composition ==
"Give It All"
A seventeen second sample of "Give It All". Like most of the songs on Siren Song of the Counter Culture, "Give It All" is rooted melodic hardcore.

Siren Song of the Counter Culture is primarily rooted in melodic hardcore. According to Ultimate Guitar Archive, the album contains archetypal elements of punk rock, including "fast-paced drum beats, powerful guitar chords and thrashing bass lines". Each song has multiple guitar layers combined with rhythmic arrangements, which add "melodic flavor". Critics have compared the album to works by other punk rock bands like AFI, Bad Religion, Blink-182, Poison the Well, Refused, and Sick of It All. AllMusic's Johnny Loftus commented that the band diversified their lyrics for Siren Song of the Counter Culture, mixing social and political commentary with personal reflection. McIlrath believes that the album is about standing up for oneself, and not being afraid to have a dissenting opinion.

The first track on Siren Song of the Counter Culture is "State of the Union", a short and aggressive song that contains the most screaming on the album. Its lyrics criticize bureaucratic injustice, as well as those who do not speak out against injustice. Davey Boy of Sputnikmusic believes "The First Drop" is more toned down, and acts as a bridge to the third track "Life Less Frightening". "Life Less Frightening" is a conventionally structured song, that Boy notes almost has an alternative rock sound, but keeps underlying punk rock traits. The fourth track, "Paper Wings", tells a sad story about growing apart, backed by a guitar lick that lasts the entire song. "Blood to Bleed" features reflective lyrics about broken hearts, presented from a first-person perspective.

The sixth and seventh tracks, "To Them These Streets Belong" and "Tip the Scales", have AFI-like vocals according to Blistering's Justin Donnelly. "Anywhere But Here" features a backing drum beat that both Donnelly and Ultimate Guitar Archive highlighted as the best part of the song, with Ultimate Guitar Archive describing it as "contagious". "Give It All" is a short hardcore track, that Boy believes is reminiscent of songs by The Offspring. McIlrath commented that the song is "kind of a punk rock anthem about being a punk rocker in today's world; like what being a human being in today's world is like". "Dancing for Rain" opens with acoustic strumming, before transitioning into a frenetic pace, combining pop elements with punk rock. The penultimate track, "Swing Life Away", is an acoustic ballad, with simple lyrics discussing daily life and the working class. The final track, "Rumors of My Demise Have Been Greatly Exaggerated" features one of the few guitar solos on the album, and "end[s] things in huge style", according to Donnelly.

== Release and commercial performance ==
To promote Siren Song of the Counter Culture, Rise Against toured extensively throughout North America, Europe, Australia, and Japan. They participated in the 2004 Warped Tour, and supported Bad Religion in a late 2004 tour. In 2005, Rise Against participated in the Taste of Chaos tour (with Funeral for a Friend, Killswitch Engage, Story of the Year, and The Used), Give it a Name festival (with Alexisonfire, Coheed and Cambria, Fightstar, and MewithoutYou), and the Reading and Leeds Festivals in the UK. McIlrath commented that the band was "touring like maniacs at the time", accepting every show they could get into.

Siren Song of the Counter Culture was released on August 10, 2004; the first 30,000 copies contained a "question authority" sticker. For the first six months, the album sold poorly, and attracted little fanfare. Geffen did not promote the band, as they were virtually unaware of their existence. This led Aubin Paul of Punknews.org to jokingly comment that Fat Wreck Chords was doing more to promote the band. Rise Against's incessant touring schedule resulted in greater exposure, which contributed to a gradual increase in sales. Eventually, Geffen noticed the increase in sales, and began promoting the band.

Siren Song of the Counter Culture became Rise Against's first album to reach the Billboard 200, peaking at number 136 on August 28, 2004. It also reached number one on the Top Heatseekers chart. According to The A.V. Club, the album sold over 400,000 copies by 2006. It was certified gold by the Recording Industry Association of America in 2009, denoting shipments of 500,000 copies in the United States. Elsewhere, the album was certified platinum by Music Canada, denoting shipments of 100,000 copies in Canada; and gold by the Australian Recording Industry Association, denoting shipments of 35,000 copies in Australia.

Three songs from Siren Song of the Counter Culture were released as singles: "Give It All", "Swing Life Away", and "Life Less Frightening". All three songs charted on the Modern Rock Tracks chart, peaking at number thirty-seven, twelve, and thirty-three respectively. Accompanying music videos were shot for "Give It All" and "Swing Life Away". In the "Give It All" video, Rise Against performs in a crowded subway car, while other people travel throughout Chicago vandalizing and defacing billboards and posters. The "Swing Life Away" video is more relaxed, and follows the band members as they hangout with friends. The video for "Swing Life Away" was shot over a year after the release of Siren Song Of The Counter Culture, a rarity in the music industry, as most videos are shot only a few months after the song's parent album is released. Music journalists have credited "Give It All" and "Swing Life Away" as helping Rise Against achieve mainstream appeal. John J. Moser of The Morning Call considers "Give It All" to be the band's breakthrough single, while Alternative Addiction wrote: "'Swing Life Away' catapulted Rise Against past Anti-Flag to the point where they've been with the past three albums as one of most established bands going in rock."

== Critical reception ==
Professional ratings
Review scores
Source	Rating
AllMusic	3/5 stars
Contactmusic.com	7/10
Pitchfork	2.9/10
Sputnikmusic	4/5
Ultimate Guitar Archive	9.3/10

Siren Song of the Counter Culture received mostly positive reviews from critics. Ultimate Guitar Archive lauded almost every aspect of the album, with particular praise for the use of multiple guitar layers, its "poetically angry lyrics", and McIlrath's vocals. However, the review also mentioned that Rise Against fans may be disappointed with the band's move towards a more accessible sound. Davey Boy of Sputnikmusic described Siren Song of the Counter Culture as an "impressively energetic and surprisingly accessible package of punk, hardcore and rock all rolled into one", and praised the simple yet effective lyrics. Writing for The Herald-News, Chris Brooks highlighted Brandon Barnes' drumming, and recommend the album to drum fans. Alex Parker of Contactmusic.com complimented the lyrics for their relevancy, and noted their subtlety when compared to Green Day's 2004 album American Idiot.

Boy found the paucity of individually memorable songs to be Siren Song of the Counter Culture's biggest issue, and noted the album's lack of immediacy. Donnelly and Loftus felt that some of the album's songs suffered from overproduction, which lessened their lyrical potency and musical aggression. Loftus ultimately summarized his review by saying "Siren Song of the Counter Culture is simply the band's latest statement ... to recruit more kids for the raging". Marc Hogan's review for Pitchfork is written as if it were a letter addressed to American political activist Ralph Nader. In his review, Hogan heavily chastises the band for their "empty political sloganeering and crybaby bullshit", and compares the album's "over-the-top bloviating" to Nader's 2004 presidential campaign.

== Track listing ==
All lyrics are written by Tim McIlrath; all music is composed by Tim McIlrath, Joe Principe, Brandon Barnes and Chris Chasse, unless otherwised noted.

No.	Title	Writer(s)	Length
1.	"State of the Union"		2:19
2.	"The First Drop"		2:39
3.	"Life Less Frightening"		3:44
4.	"Paper Wings"		3:43
5.	"Blood to Bleed"		3:48
6.	"To Them These Streets Belong"		2:49
7.	"Tip the Scales"		3:49
8.	"Anywhere but Here"		3:38
9.	"Give It All"		2:50
10.	"Dancing for Rain"		4:01
11.	"Swing Life Away"	Tim McIlrath; Neil Hennessy	3:20
12.	"Rumors of My Demise Have Been Greatly Exaggerated"		4:14
Total length:			40:54

European bonus track
No.	Title	Writer(s)	Length
13.	"Fix Me"	Greg Ginn	0:55
Total length:			41:49

2005 special edition bonus tracks
No.	Title	Writer(s)	Length
13.	"Obstructed View"		2:01
14.	"Fix Me"	Greg Ginn	0:55
Total length:			43:50

== Personnel ==
Credits adapted from the liner notes of Siren Song of the Counter Culture.

Rise Against

- Tim McIlrath – lead vocals, rhythm guitar
- Chris Chasse – lead guitar, backing vocals
- Joe Principe – bass guitar, backing vocals
- Brandon Barnes – drums, percussion

Additional musicians

- Neil Hennessy – additional backing vocals
- Nicholas Simons – cello

Artwork

- Shepard Fairey – cover illustration
- Lisa Johnson – photography

Production

- Garth Richardson – producer
- Dean Maher – engineer
- Bryan Gallant, Lee Robertson, and Scott Ternan – assistant engineers
- Steve Sisco – assistant mixing
- Andy Wallace – mixing
- Ben Kaplan and John O'Mahoney – digital editing
- Richard Leighton – guitar technician
- Eric "Wilcard" Bonny – stage technician
- Chris Crippen – drum technician

Management

- Missy Worth – management for Artistic License
- Corrie Chiristopher – booking agent for Fierce Talent
- Marlene Tsucii – international booking agent for Creative Artists Agency
- Ron Handler – A&R
- Graham Martin – A&R coordinator

== Charts ==
Chart (2004–05)	Peak position
US Billboard 200	136
US Heatseekers Albums (Billboard)	1

== Certifications ==
Region	Certification	Certified units/sales
Australia (ARIA)	Gold	35,000^{^}
Canada (Music Canada)	Platinum	100,000^{^}
Germany (BVMI)	Gold	100,000^{‡}
United States (RIAA)	Gold	500,000^{^}
^{^} Shipments figures based on certification alone.^{‡} Sales+streaming figures based on certification alone.
