= Den Atelier =

Coordinates: 49°25′40″N 05°57′12″E

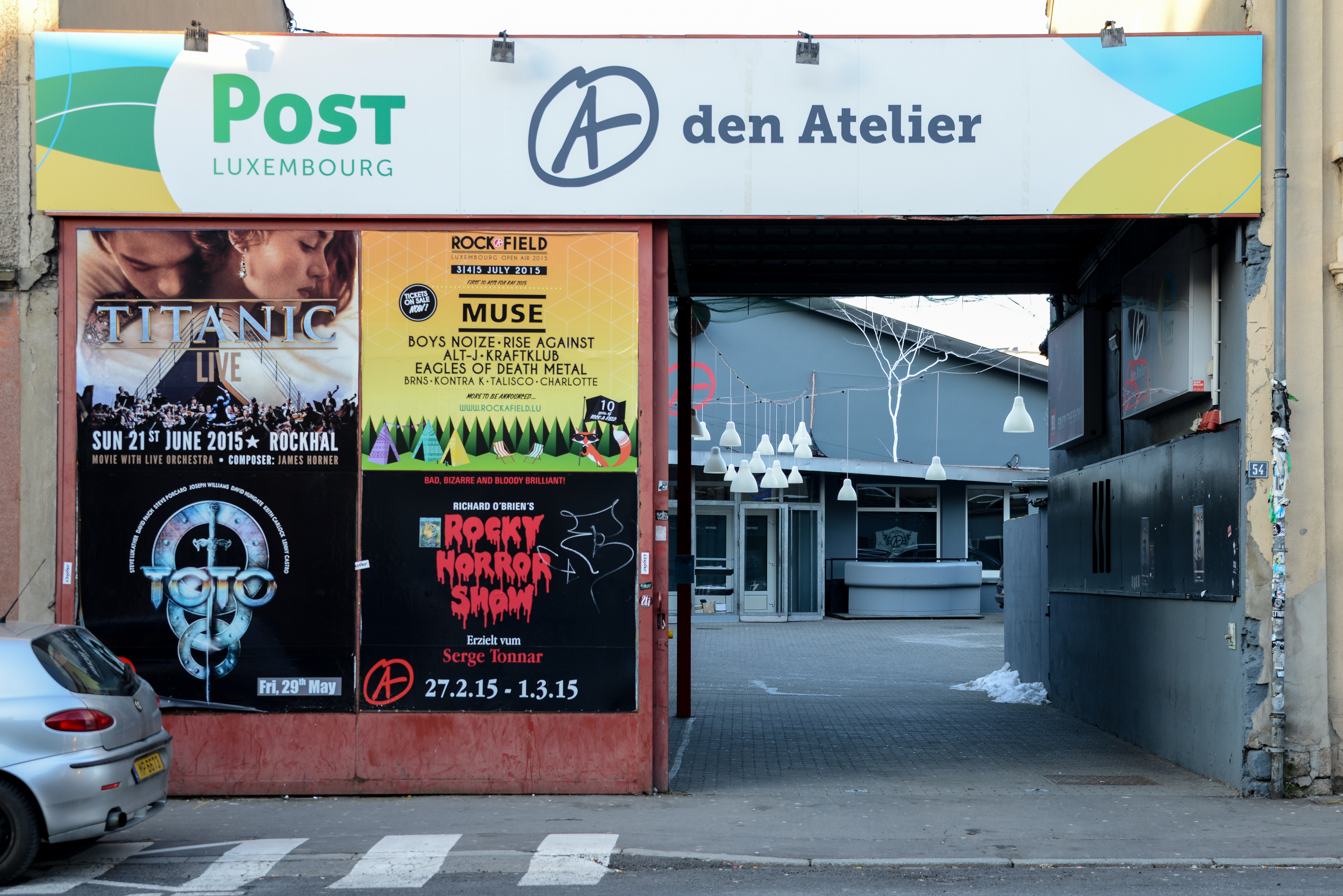
Den Atelier, February 2015

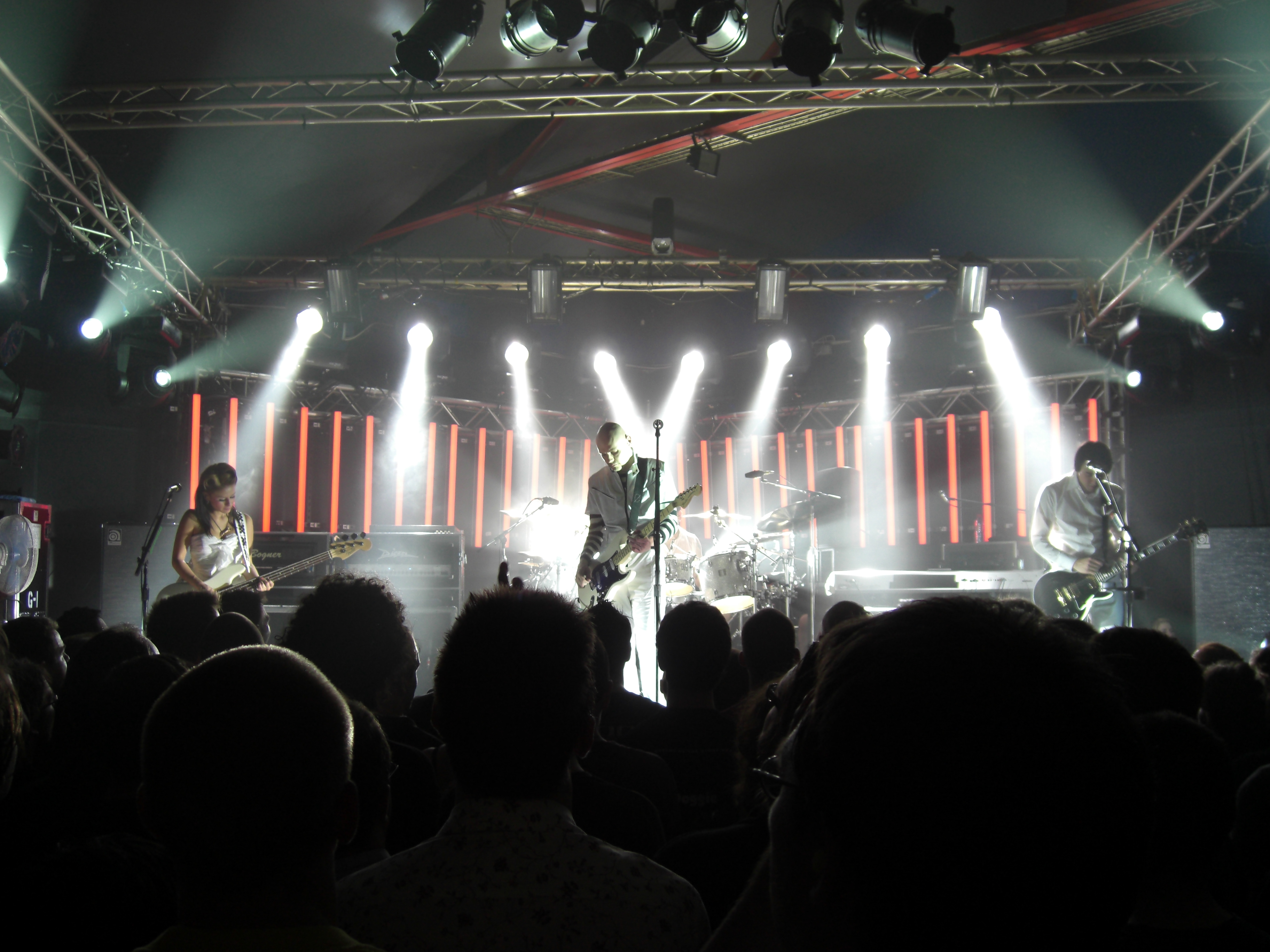
The Smashing Pumpkins, appearing here 24 May 2007, have been one of the most famous bands to appear at Den Atelier since 1995.

Den Atelier is an indoor music venue in Luxembourg City, in southern Luxembourg. It is located on Rue de Hollerich in the Gare district, and holds up to 1,200 people. The venue's name is Luxembourgish for "the workshop", as it is located in a former Renault truck garage.

Den Atelier opened on 23 October 1995. Its founders first conceived of the concept in the early 1990s, and were motivated by their impression that there was no place in Luxembourg that showcased international Rock, Alternative Rock and Indie bands. Their idea was to create a space similar to the Ancienne Belgique in Brussels, Paradiso in Amsterdam, or the Bataclan in Paris.

Since being founded in 1995, it has hosted a number of world-famous headlining acts, including alt-J, Arctic Monkeys, Bastille, Blondie, James Blunt, Charli XCX, Franz Ferdinand, Garbage, Gojira, Kraftwerk, Cyndi Lauper, Avril Lavigne, The Libertines, L'Impératrice, King Gizzard & the Lizard Wizard, LCD Soundsystem, Amy Macdonald, Massive Attack, Megadeth, Motörhead, Muse, My Chemical Romance, Pixies, Placebo, Queens of the Stone Age, Razorlight, Simple Plan, The Smashing Pumpkins, and Wolfmother.
