= The Good Left Undone =

Single by Rise Against

from the album The Sufferer & the Witness
- Released: May 22, 2007
- Studio: The Blasting Room (Fort Collins, Colorado)
- Length: 4:10
- Label: Geffen
- Songwriter: Rise Against
- Producers: Jason Livermore; Bill Stevenson

Rise Against singles chronology
| "Prayer of the Refugee" (2006) | "The Good Left Undone" (2007) | "Re-Education (Through Labor)" (2008) |

"The Good Left Undone" is the third single from American punk rock band Rise Against's fourth studio album, The Sufferer & the Witness (2006). The song impacted radio on May 22, 2007. In June 2007, the band announced they would be holding a contest to determine who could make the best video for the song. They released a bulletin over their Myspace account giving information about the contest.

On June 25, 2007, the band premiered their own video on MTV's website, as well as on MTV2 every hour.

The song peaked at number six on the Billboard Alternative Songs chart, Rise Against's second top 10 single (the first being the previous single "Prayer of the Refugee") and the highest-charting single from the album. The song spent 30 weeks on the chart prior to this peak, making it the band's slowest climb to the chart's top 10.

== Music video ==
The video was shot in 2006 and released in 2007. It shows a girl, who is collecting various kinds of flowers. When she comes to field of sunflowers then appear Tim, Zach, Joe and Brandon, which are dug under ground in glass bottles. At the end the girl pulls out of the land the flowers and the musicians can see bright sun rays.

== Composition ==
In an interview with theredalert.com front man Tim McIlrath was asked if the instrumental part at the end of the song was originally a separate piece of music. He replied: "That one was actually pure collaboration. With a lot of our songs, Joe Principe will write the whole thing, or I'll write the whole thing, or Chris Chasse will write the whole thing, and then we'll all collaborate on little parts here and there. But 'The Good Left Undone' was really all 4 of us, Brandon Barnes included, all adding our own two cents." After the bridge of "Survive", the guitar part is that of the instrumental between "The Good Left Undone" and "Survive".

== Charts ==
=== Weekly charts ===
Weekly chart performance for "The Good Left Undone"
| Chart (2008) | Peak position |
|---|---|
| Canada Rock (Billboard) | 29 |
| US Alternative Airplay (Billboard) | 6 |

=== Year-end charts ===
Year-end chart performance for "The Good Left Undone"
| Chart (2008) | Peak position |
|---|---|
| US Alternative Airplay (Billboard) | 29 |
