= Prayer of the Refugee =

Single by Rise Against

from the album The Sufferer & the Witness
- Released: November 2006
- Recorded: January–April 2006
- Studio: The Blasting Room (Fort Collins, Colorado)
- Genre: Hardcore punk; melodic hardcore
- Length: 3:19
- Label: Geffen
- Songwriter: Rise Against
- Producers: Bill Stevenson; Jason Livermore

Rise Against singles chronology
| "Ready to Fall" (2006) | "Prayer of the Refugee" (2006) | "The Good Left Undone" (2007) |

Music video
- "Prayer of the Refugee" on YouTube

"Prayer of the Refugee" is a song by American punk rock band Rise Against, featured on their fourth studio album, The Sufferer & the Witness (2006). The lyrics were written by lead vocalist Tim McIlrath, and deal with the themes of forced displacement and the societal issues surrounding refugees. The song uses a contrasting verse-chorus form, with slow and melancholic verses against fast-paced and chaotic choruses. It was released as The Sufferer & the Witness's second single in 2006.

Commercially, "Prayer of the Refugee" reached number seven on the Alternative Songs chart, and was later certified platinum by the Recording Industry Association of America. Critics praised the contrasting verse-chorus format, as well as the simple yet effective lyrics. In the accompanying music video, the band performs in a retail store, with intermittent shots of foreign workers making the store products. The band wanted the video to showcase how conventional business models allow for various human rights violations.

== Recording and composition ==
The lyrics for "Prayer of the Refugee" were written by lead vocalist Tim McIlrath, while the music was collectively written by the band. Bill Stevenson and Jason Livermore engineered and produced the song, while Chris Lord-Alge served as the audio mixer. It was recorded at The Blasting Room in Fort Collins, Colorado, and mastered by Ted Jensen.

"Prayer of the Refugee" is three minutes and nineteen seconds, and combines elements of hardcore punk and melodic hardcore. According to the song's sheet music, the composition is written in the time signature of common time, with a fast tempo of 144 beats per minute during the verses and 200 beats per minute during the chorus. It follows verse-chorus form, and is composed in the key E♭ minor, with a melody that spans a tonal range of A♭_{3} to C♭_{6}. The song is about forced displacement, and the societal issues surrounding refugees. The lyrics begin from the perspective of a refugee telling their child of their life before displacement, backed by "plaintive guitars and weary singing". The slow opening directly contrasts the chorus, which "jarringly explode[s]" into a fast-paced rhythm section and chaotic vocals. After a second verse-chorus section, the bridge begins, which is followed by a guitar solo by McIlrath. The songs concludes with a final chorus section.

== Release and reception ==
"Prayer of the Refugee" began playing on radio stations in November 2006. The following month, it was released as the second single from the band's fourth studio album, The Sufferer and the Witness. Commercially, "Prayer of the Refugee" reached number seven on the Alternative Songs chart in the United States. It was certified platinum in July 2013 by the Recording Industry Association of America, denoting shipments of 1,000,000 copies.

Several critics have highlighted the contrasting verse and chorus format. Drew Beringer of AbsolutePunk felt that the contrast allows the song to slowly build up, "only to kick you in the gut with the bombastic chorus". AllMusic's Corey Apar and PopMatters's Will Rausch had similar opinions, as they both described the chorus as "empowering". Writing for Sputnikmusic, Davey Boy praised the simple yet effective lyrics, and compared "Prayer of the Refugee" to one of Rise Against's previous songs, "Life Less Frightening". Eric Clark of The Gazette called "Prayer of the Refugee" The Sufferer & The Witness's "crowning achievement".

== Music video ==
The accompanying music video was directed by Tony Petrossian. In the video, Rise Against performs inside a retail store. The camera intermittently zooms in on products, such as shoes and toy cars, before zooming out to foreign workers and children making the products. Near the end of the video, the workers place Made in USA stickers on packaged boxes, while the band members destroys items in the store. The video ends with a shot of the broken and fallen products, which spell out "fair trade".

Petrossian originally thought to write a video treatment about a refugee trying to enter the United States, but knew that the band was going to receive several treatments with the same idea. Instead, he decided to portray the plight of the refugee from a different angle. The band members unanimously agreed upon Petrossian's treatment. The video deals various themes, including consumerism, fair trade, and sweatshops, and attempts to showcase how conventional business models allow for various human rights violations.

== Credits and personnel ==
Credits adapted from the liner notes of The Sufferer & the Witness.

=== Rise Against ===
- Tim McIlrath – lead vocals, rhythm guitar
- Chris Chasse – lead guitar, backing vocals
- Joe Principe – bass guitar, backing vocals
- Brandon Barnes – drums

Additional personnel

- Chad Price – backing vocals

=== Production ===
- Bill Stevenson, Jason Livermore – producers
- Bill Stevenson, Jason Livermore – audio engineering
- Chris Lord-Alge – mixing
- Ted Jensen – mastering

== Charts ==
=== Weekly charts ===
Weekly chart performance for "Prayer of the Refugee"
| Chart (2007) | Peak position |
|---|---|
| Canada Rock (Billboard) | 26 |
| US Alternative Airplay (Billboard) | 7 |

=== Year-end charts ===
Year-end chart performance for "Prayer of the Refugee"
| Chart (2007) | Position |
|---|---|
| US Alternative Songs (Billboard) | 22 |

== Certifications ==
Certifications and sales for "Prayer of the Refugee"
| Region | Certification | Certified units/sales |
|---|---|---|
| Austria (IFPI Austria) | Platinum | 30,000^{*} |
| Germany (BVMI) | Gold | 150,000^{‡} |
| New Zealand (RMNZ) | Gold | 15,000^{‡} |
| United Kingdom (BPI) | Silver | 200,000^{‡} |
| United States (RIAA) | Platinum | 1,000,000^{‡} |
^{*} Sales figures based on certification alone.^{‡} Sales+streaming figures based on certification alone.
