= Reverend and the Makers discography =

Band discography

- Studio albums: 8
- Extended plays: 1
- Live albums: 2
- Singles: 22
- Music videos: 5

The discography of Reverend and the Makers, an English rock band, consists of eight studio albums, two live albums, one compilation album, one extended play, and twenty-two singles.

The band was formed in 2005 after Jon McClure (flatmate to Alex Turner of the Arctic Monkeys) created the band after fronting two in the past, 1984 and Judan Suki. The band signed to Wall of Sound before releasing their debut album, The State of Things, which reached number 5 on the charts and sold 25,000 copies in its first week. The debut single off the album, "Heavyweight Champion of the World", reached the top ten, and the follow-up "He Said He Loved Me" also did well in the charts. The third and penultimate single from the album, "Open Your Window", was featured on FIFA 09, the popular football video game. The band toured, and soon after rumours began to surface that the band was close to splitting up.

However, the band's second album, A French Kiss in the Chaos, was released in 2009, and they were approached by Oasis to tour with them in what proved to be Oasis' final tour. McClure has appeared on Never Mind the Buzzcocks and Soccer AM in support of the album. The debut single, "Silence Is Talking", was received well by critics and fans, reaching number 14 on the UK Singles Chart, but the album received mixed reviews. In October 2009, the band recorded their live concert at the O2 Academy Sheffield and released it as a live album via the internet, titled Live in the UK.

The band released their third studio album, @Reverend Makers, on 18 June 2012, with the album reaching number 16 on the UK Albums Chart.

In 2025, the band collaborated with actress Vicky McClure on the single "Haircut".

== Albums ==
=== Studio albums ===
Title	Details	Peak chart positions				Certifications (sales threshold)
Title	Details	UK	UK Indie	NLD Alt.	SCO	Certifications (sales threshold)
The State of Things	First studio album; Release date: 17 September 2007; Label: Wall of Sound	5	1	21	8	BPI: Gold
A French Kiss in the Chaos	Second studio album; Release date: 27 July 2009; Label: Wall of Sound	19	2	—	40	
@Reverend Makers	Third studio album; Release date: 18 June 2012; Label: Cooking Vinyl	16	2	—	25	
ThirtyTwo	Fourth studio album; Release date: 24 February 2014; Label: Cooking Vinyl	13	4	—	23	
Mirrors	Fifth studio album; Release date: 9 October 2015; Label: Cooking Vinyl	16	2	—	16	
The Death of a King	Sixth studio album; Release date: 22 September 2017; Label: Cooking Vinyl	11	3	—	13	
Heatwave in the Cold North	Seventh studio album; Release date: 28 April 2023; Label: Distiller Records	6	2	—	7	
Is This How Happiness Feels?	Eighth studio album; Release date: 24 April 2026; Label: Distiller Records	7	1	—	4	
"—" denotes a recording that did not chart or was not released in that territory.

=== Live albums ===
- Reverend and the Makers: Live in the UK (2009)
- Reverend and the Makers Live in Sheffield (2012)

=== Compilation albums ===
Title	Details	Peak chart positions		
Title	Details	UK	UK Indie	SCO
Best Of	Release date: 20 September 2019; Label: Cooking Vinyl	57	3	24

=== Other albums ===
- And Whilst the World Was Asleep We Were Listening To... limited edition CD mixtape (27 May 2007)
- Ten Songs (demo)

== Extended plays ==
- Sundown on the Empire / 18-30 / The Machine – Remixes (2008)

== Singles ==
Title	Year	Peak chart positions					Certifications	Album
Title	Year	UK	UK Indie	AUS	AUS Dance	SCO	Certifications	Album
"Heavyweight Champion of the World"	2007	8	1	85	14	13	BPI: Gold	The State of Things
"He Said He Loved Me"	2007	16	1	—	—	18		The State of Things
"Open Your Window"	2007	65	2	—	—	31		The State of Things
"Silence Is Talking"	2009	124	11	—	—	—		A French Kiss in the Chaos
"Sundown on the Empire"	2009	— (Note: "Haircut" did not enter the UK Singles Chart Top 100, but peaked at number 52 on the UK Physical Single Sales Chart.)	8	—	—	44		A French Kiss in the Chaos
"No Soap (In a Dirty War)"	2009	—	—	—	—	—		A French Kiss in the Chaos
"Bassline"	2012	—	—	—	—	—		@Reverend_Makers
"The Wrestler"	2012	—	—	—	—	—		@Reverend_Makers
"Out of the Shadows"	2012	—	—	—	—	—		@Reverend_Makers
"Shine the Light"	2013	—	—	—	—	—		@Reverend_Makers
"The Only One"	2014	—	—	—	—	—		ThirtyTwo
"Black Widow"	2015	—	—	—	—	—		Mirrors
"Heatwave in the Cold North"	2022	— (Note: "Heatwave in the Cold North" did not enter the UK Singles Chart, but peaked at number 74 on the UK Singles Downloads Chart.)	—	—	—	—		Heatwave in the Cold North
"High"	2023	—	—	—	—	—		Heatwave in the Cold North
"Problems"	2023	—	—	—	—	—		Heatwave in the Cold North
"A Letter to My 21 Year Old Self"	2023	—	—	—	—	—		Heatwave in the Cold North
"You Again" (with The Lottery Winners)	2024	—	—	—	—	—		Non-album single
"Late Night Phone Call"	2024	— (Note: "Late Night Phone Call" did not enter the UK Singles Chart Top 100, but peaked at number 77 on the UK Singles Downloads Chart.)	—	—	—	—		Is This How Happiness Feels?
"Haircut" (with Vicky McClure)	2025	— (Note: "Haircut" did not enter the UK Singles Chart Top 100, but peaked at number 17 on the UK Singles Downloads Chart.)	—	—	—	—		Is This How Happiness Feels?
"UFO"	2025	—	—	—	—	—		Is This How Happiness Feels?
"Twenty-Seven Past Midnight"	2026	—	—	—	—	—		Is This How Happiness Feels?
"Fucked Up" (featuring Robbie Williams)	2026	—	—	—	—	—		Is This How Happiness Feels?
"—" denotes releases that did not chart.
