= List of musicians from Sheffield =

The following is a list (in alphabetical order) of major bands and musicians from Sheffield, a city with musical heritage of note in South Yorkshire, England

== 0–9 ==
- 65daysofstatic

== A ==
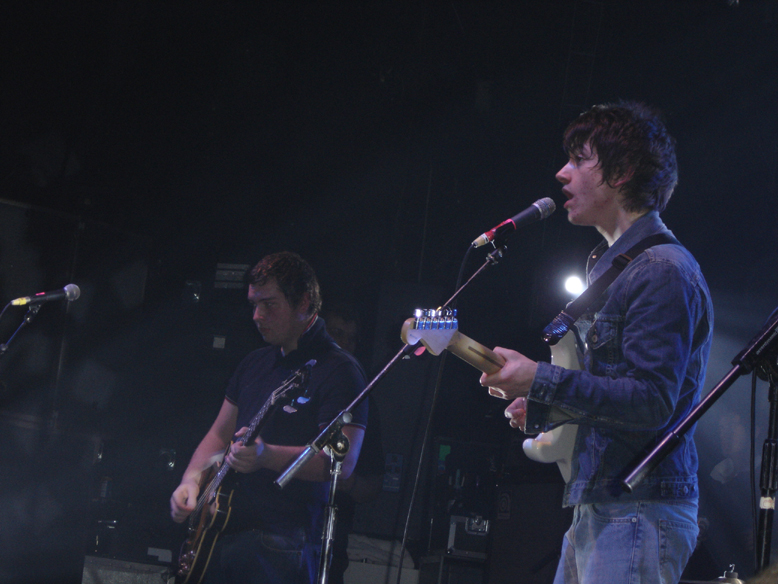
Arctic Monkeys playing at the Newcastle Academy on the NME Tour

- ABC
- Ace
- Alvarez Kings
- Arctic Monkeys
- Ahmad Hussain
- has a bad Artery

== B ==
- Babybird
- Derek Bailey
- Bal-Sagoth
- Josephine Barstow
- Bassomatic
- William Sterndale Bennett
- Dave Berry
- Lisa Beznosiuk
- The Black Dog
- Blameless
- Bring Me the Horizon
- Bromheads Jacket

== C ==
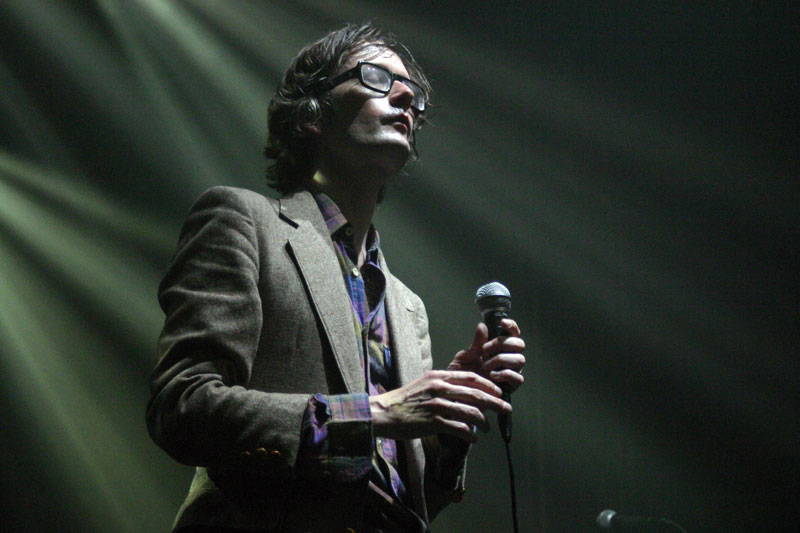
Jarvis Cocker live in concert, 2007

- Cabaret Voltaire
- Paul Carrack (Squeeze, Ace & Mike + The Mechanics)
- Chakk
- Clock DVA
- Jarvis Cocker
- Joe Cocker
- Comsat Angels
- Jamie Cook
- The Crookes
- Steve Clark

== D ==
- Dead Sons
- Def Leppard
- Reginald Dixon (World-famous theatre Organ player)
- Drenge
- The Dylans

== F ==
- Forgemasters - Bleep techno act composed of Robert Gordon, Winston Hazel and Sean Maher.
- Graham Fellows
- Future Loop Foundation

== G ==
- Margaret Gale
- Mark Gasser
- Peter Glossop

== H ==
- Happy Clappers
- Harrisons
- Dave Hawley
- Richard Hawley
- Wilfred Heaton
- Heaven 17
- Matt Helders
- Victoria Hogg
- Hoggboy
- The Human League

== I ==
- I Monster
- I Set The Sea On Fire
- I'm So Hollow
- In The Nursery

== J ==
- Joe Cocker

== K ==
- Krush

== L ==
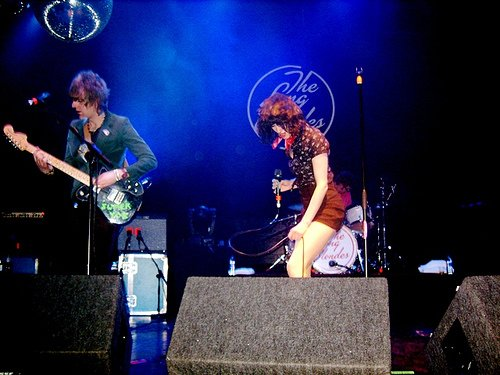
The Long Blondes live, 2007

- The Last Shadow Puppets
- Ann Lee
- Letters and Colours
- Little Man Tate
- Living in a Box
- The Long Blondes
- The Longpigs
- The Lonely Hearts

== M ==
- Malevolence
- Milburn
- Moloko
- Mongrel
- Monkey Swallows the Universe

== N ==
- Nai Harvest
- Neil McSweeney

== O ==
- One Thousand Violins
- Tony Oxley
- Nick O'Malley

== P ==
- Pink Grease
- Pulp

== R ==
- Ramases
- Bernard Rands
- Reverend And The Makers
- Rogue State
- Rolo Tomassi
- Roadhouse

== S ==
- Rohan de Saram
- Self Esteem
- John Shuttleworth (fictitious character)
- Slow Club
- Stoney
- Sophie and the Giants
- Speedy

== T ==
- Tapton Youth Brass Band
- Pete Thomas
- Thompson Twins
- Toddla T
- Alex Turner

== V ==
- Vice Versa
- Vitamin Z

== W ==
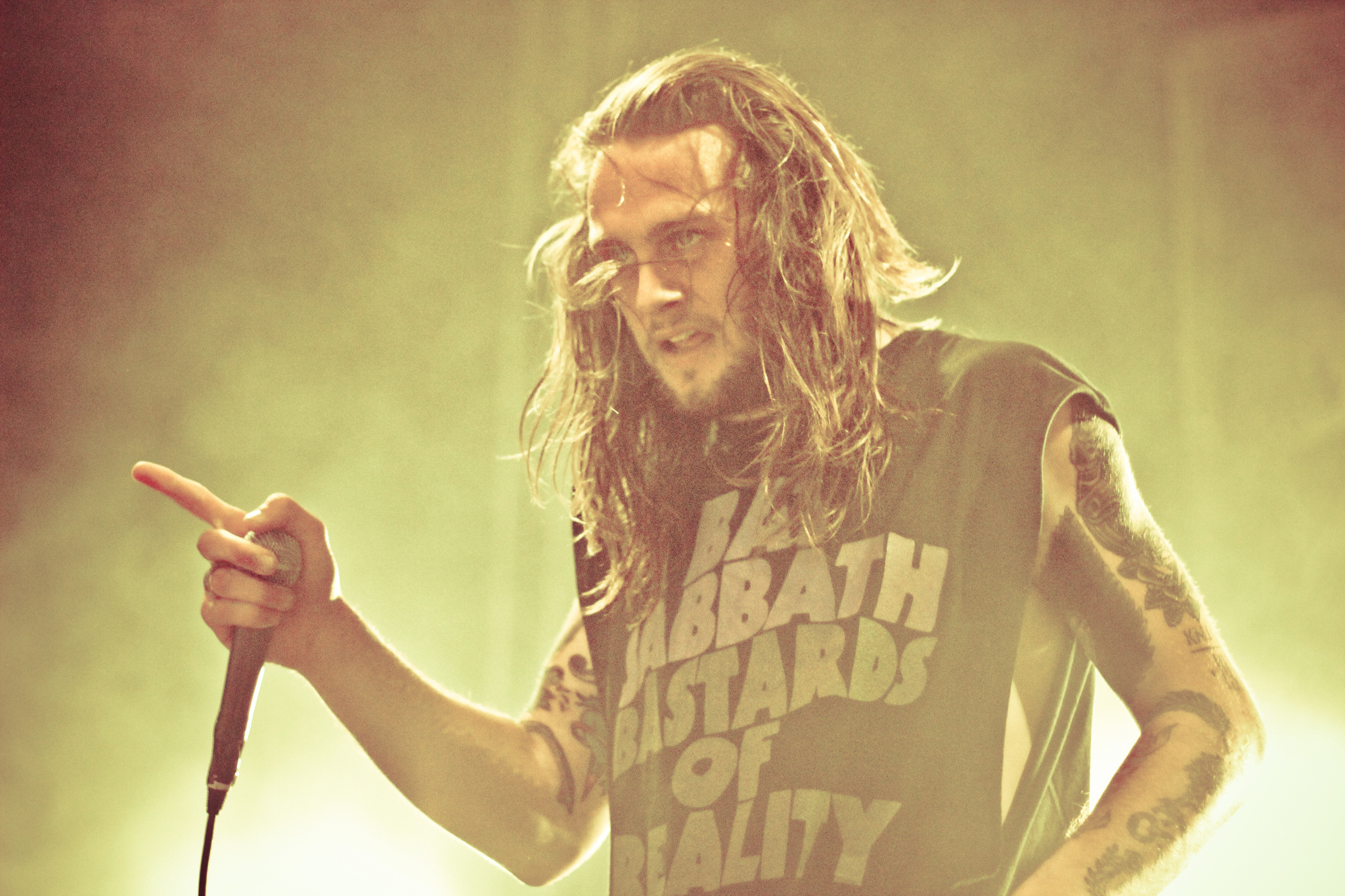
While She Sleeps live in concert, 2012

- Warm Dust
- Wavestar
- While She Sleeps

== See also ==
- Bands and musicians from Yorkshire and North East England
