= New Yorkshire =

Musical movement

- Branch: Indie rock
- Years active: Early 2000s–late 2000s
- Location: Yorkshire (particularly Sheffield and Leeds)

New Yorkshire was a musical movement identified by UK music magazine NME in 2005, in response to the success of Yorkshire bands such as Arctic Monkeys, the Cribs, and Kaiser Chiefs at the time. The bands cited by the magazine included Sheffield guitar-based groups Milburn, Harrisons, Bromheads Jacket, and the Long Blondes, and Leeds bands the Pigeon Detectives, Your Vegas, the Research, and Black Wire. NME identified new crossover genres developing in Leeds, which it described as "disco-punk" and "dance-metal" with ¡Forward, Russia! and the Sunshine Underground as examples of this.

Other bands that fall into this genre include Stable, O Fracas, the Defunct, Dead Disco, Stoney, This Et Al, the Ivories, Monkey Swallows the Universe, Tiny Dancers, Little Man Tate, Bhuna, Solar Powered Butterflies, Reverend and the Makers, Duels, Little Ze, Letters and Colours, the Yell, Smokers Die Younger, Champion Kickboxer, and One Night Only (from Ryedale, North Yorkshire).

Various Yorkshire-based record labels have worked on DIY releases around the same time, including the Laundrette, Thee Sheffield Phonographic Corporation, and Spoonjuice Records.

The Leeds label Dance to the Radio was formed by ¡Forward, Russia!, and its February 2006 release, What We All Want, showcased a number of New Yorkshire bands, including the Playmates, the Lodger, Bam Bam Francs and Voltage Union.

The movement was in its prime between 2005 and 2008, where a number of the artists reached national recognition and were successful in the UK charts. However, many disbanded in the following years as they failed to achieve the long-term success seen by some of the more notable acts, with few bands from the region appearing in record charts in the late 2000s and early 2010s.

== Response ==
In the late 2000s, some Yorkshire bands showed their distaste for the cleanly produced style of New Yorkshire but instead incorporating elements of grunge. The forefront groups in this grunge revival movement were Leeds bands Dinosaur Pile-Up, Pulled Apart by Horses, Old Romantic Killer Band and Wonderswan, as well as nearby groups Above Them and the Tempus.

== See also ==
- Music in Leeds
- Landfill indie
