= Thee Sheffield Phonographic Corporation =

Thee Sheffield Phonographic Corporation, or Thee SPC, is an independent record label based in Sheffield, UK. It is one of the most influential labels in the Yorkshire area, having given early breaks and support to many bands in the so-called New Yorkshire scene. The label was formed by Markie Mofo, Rob Chuck, Darren Chuck and Missy Tassles; all one-time members of bands including Velodrome 2000, The Motherfuckers and Chuck, Mark went on to be in The Parallelograms and The Mini Skips whilst Missy has continued in bands Flying Wing, Black Light Ray, The Sleazoids performed briefly with The Wedding Present and solo as The Girl Next Door. The SPC label has an extensive catalogue; their trademarks are thick, coloured vinyl and sleevenotes written in a comical Victorian style. They used to broadcast a weekly radio show on the internet station Sheffield Live.

Thee SPC has released singles and albums by various Sheffield-based bands and released two compilations CDs, one of Sheffield guitar bands with the title A Box of Odd, and one of Sheffield electronic music with the title Thee Sheffield Radiophonic Workshop. Their only non-Sheffield-related release to date is an album of songs by American chicken farmer Charles E. Cullen. Another notable release was the novelty single "Who The Chuff Are The Mardy Bums?", an affectionate parody of Arctic Monkeys.

Their irregular fanzine Thee Humbug always includes a CD of tracks by the featured artists. The second issue is now a collector's piece, changing hands for relatively large sums on eBay, as the CD features an early track by the then unknown Arctic Monkeys and some rare Long Blondes material.

Some recent single releases have been released on CD as well as vinyl. "Virtual vinyl" is also available from the label's website, in the form of free downloads, often giving a taste of album releases.

The label has featured in Britain's biggest-selling music weekly NME, in an article about small record labels, as part of a feature highlighting the upcoming Sheffield and Leeds scenes, and as the subject of a short article in a series about record labels.

== 7-inch singles ==
- The Motherfuckers, "I'm a Fucker". Translucent red vinyl. 2003.
- Chuck, "No Not Ah". Translucent blue vinyl. 2003.
- Champion Kickboxer, "Like Him + Her + Her + Me". Solid white vinyl. 2004.
- The Long Blondes. "New Idols". Solid pink vinyl. 2004.
- Chuck. "Umm Na Nagay" / "We Got Squeezed". Solid blue vinyl. 2005.
- Smokers Die Younger. "Kermit Song". Solid green vinyl. 2005.
- The Scarlet Tuesday/Balor Knights. "A Perfect Quarter" / "Just Cos Keenan Says So". Solid yellow vinyl. 2006.
- The Mardy Bums. "Who The Chuff Are The Mardy Bums?". Orange vinyl. 2006.
- Monkey Swallows the Universe. "Science". Blue vinyl. 2006.
- Slow Down Tallahassee. "So Much For Love". Lipstick Red vinyl. 2007.
- Meat for A Dark Day. "Vanity Unfair". Clear vinyl. 2007.
- The Bon Bon Club. "Love Is Blind" / "Lullaby" / "Romantic Rights". Grey vinyl. 2008.
- Smokers Die Younger. "Sketchpads". Black vinyl. 2008.
- Slow Down Tallahassee/Standard Fare. "Angel of Death" / "Tricks" / "Dancing". 2009

== 10" EPs ==
- Champion Kickboxer. Candlepower EP. 2007.

== CD singles ==
- Monkey Swallows the Universe. "Science". 2006.
- Meat For A Dark Day. "Vanity Unfair". 2007
- Nat Johnson. "Dirty Rotten Soul". 2008

== Albums ==
- Various Artists. A Box Of Odd. 2004.
- Charles E. Cullen. The World of Charles E. Cullen. 2005.
- Monkey Swallows the Universe. The Bright Carvings. 2006.
- Smokers Die Younger. X Wants The Meat. 2006.
- Champion Kickboxer. Perforations. 2006.
- Various Artists. Thee Sheffield Radiophonic Workshop. 2006.
- Heartyeah. Traps. 2007.
- Slow Down Tallahassee. The Beautiful Light. 2008.
- Cats for Peru. ‘’The Attack of the Pitching Machine’’ 2009.
- Standard Fare. The Noyelle Beat. 2010.
- Nat Johnson & the Figureheads. I'm Across, I'm Ashore. 2012.
- The Sleazoids. Insane Escapades [Limited 12" vinyl]. 2018.

== Free download-only singles ==
- Monkey Swallows the Universe. "Sheffield Shanty" / "Jimmy Down The Well". 2005.
- Charles E Cullen. "Fading Into The Light". 2005.
- Smokers Die Younger. "I Spy Dry Fear". 2006.
- Champion Kickboxer. "Perforations" / "Maximum". 2006.
- Heartyeah. "Chris Huelsbeck". 2007.
- Horowitz. "I Need A Blanket". Virtual box-set. 2008.
- Slow Down Tallahassee. "The Beautiful Light". 2008.

== Fanzines ==
- Thee Humbug #1 - CD featuring Champion Kickboxer, The Ape Drape Escape, Balor Knights, Chuck, Ormondroyd, Repomen, Kings Have Long Arms. 2004.
- Thee Humbug #2 - CD featuring Arctic Monkeys, Screaming Mimi, Harrisons, Conrad, 1984, Charles E. Cullen, The Scarlet Tuesday, The Long Blondes, Velodrome 2000, The Hipshakes, Monkey Swallows the Universe. 2005.
- Thee Humbug #3 - CD featuring Bromheads Jacket, Fury of the Headteachers, Smokers Die Younger, Corleone, The Lodger, Daybreak, [Heart]Yeah!!, O Fracas, Monkey Swallows the Universe, Milburn. 2005.
- Thee Humbug #4 - CD featuring The Yell, Little Man Tate, ¡Forward, Russia!, Umlaut, Scaramanga 6, Cannibal Sunset, Wet Dog, The Real Losers, Optimist Club, Navvy, Bear. 2006.
- Thee Humbug #5 - CD featuring Slow Down Tallahassee, Hands & Knees, The Chiara Ls, Situationists, Dave Woodcock, Atoness, The Jakpot, Rotary Ten, The Hair, The Friendly Wilson, Poisonous Little Creatures. 2007.

== See also ==
- List of record labels
