= Open Your Window =

Single by Reverend and the Makers

from the album The State of Things
- Released: 19 November 2007
- Length: 4:03
- Label: Wall of Sound
- Songwriter(s): Alan Smyth, Jon McClure, Ed Cosens

Reverend and the Makers singles chronology
"He Said He Loved Me" (2007)	"Open Your Window" (2007)	"Sundown On the Empire / 18-30 / The Machine - Remixes" (2008)

"Open Your Window" is the third single by Reverend and the Makers, from their debut studio album The State of Things.

The song also features on FIFA 09.

== Music video ==
The music video for the song was directed by Scott Jones and Laurence Easeman, and stars Joel Goldberg. The Production Designer was Joanne Cook. Animation was contributed by Martin Lynch.

== Track listing ==
- 7": (WOS020S)

- A. "Open Your Window"
- B. "Dear Lydia"

- CD: (WOS020CD)
1. "Open Your Window"
2. "Paris at Night"
3. "Open Your Window" (Club)

== Charts ==
Chart (2008)	Peak position
UK Singles Chart	65
UK Indie Chart	1
