= Future Shock (disambiguation) =

Future Shock is a bestselling 1970 book by futurist Alvin Toffler.

Future Shock may also refer to:

== Music ==
- "Future Shock", a song by Curtis Mayfield released on the 1973 album Back to the World
- "Future Shock", a 1974 single from the album The Handsome Devils by Hello People
- "Future Shock (Dance Your Pants Off)", a 1975 single recorded by Maceo Parker and written by James Brown as the theme for his 1976 TV series
- Future Shock (EP), a 1980 EP by The Gordons
- Future Shock, a 1981 album by Gillan
- Future Shock, a 1983 album by Herbie Hancock
- "Future Shock", a song by Stanley Clarke from the 1984 album Time Exposure
- Future Shock, the 1985 reissue of the 1980 New Wave compilation album Hicks from the Sticks
- "Future Shock", a song by White Zombie from the 1987 album Soul-Crusher
- "Future Shock", a song by Stratovarius from the 1989 album Fright Night
- "Future Shock", a song by William Brittelle from the 2012 album "Loving the Chambered Nautilus"

== Film and television ==
- Future Shock (film), a 1972 documentary film on Toffler's book
- Future Shock, 1994, Bill Paxton
- Future Shock (TV series), a music and dance variety show hosted by James Brown from 1976 to 1979
- "Future Shock", an episode of Mega Man
- "Future Shock", an episode of Godzilla: The Series
- "Future Shock" (Static Shock), the opening episode of the fourth season of Static Shock
- "Future Shock", an episode of My Life as a Teenage Robot
- "Future Shock", a season four episode of Totally Spies!
- "Future Shock" (FlashForward), the series finale of the science fiction series FlashForward
- Future Shock! The Story of 2000AD, a 2015 documentary about the history of British comic 2000AD

== Other ==
- Tharg's Future Shocks, short stories in the comic 2000 AD
- Chrononauts: Futureshock, 2019 comic book in the Millarworld franchise
- The Terminator: Future Shock, 1995 computer game in the Terminator franchise
- "Ultraverse Future Shock", a Malibu Comics one-shot
- Future Shock (play), a 2011 play by Richard Stockwell
- Professional wrestler Drew McIntyre's former finisher, a double underhook DDT called Future Shock
- "Future Shock", a professional wrestling tag team consisting of Adam Cole and Kyle O'Reilly, later a part of The Undisputed Era and Undisputed Kingdom
