= Letters and Colours =

English band

Letters & Colours
- Also known as: L+C, Letters and Colours
- Origin: Sheffield, England
- Genres: Pop, rock, indie
- Instruments: Guitar, bass guitar, drums, synthesiser, vocals
- Years active: 2003–2007
- Labels: Dead Product, Mother Tongue
- Past members: Gerry Poole (Vox/synthesiser/guitar), David Jaques (guitar/programming), Paul Roberts (drums), Ian Baxter (bass guitar 2004-2006), Ric Griffiths (bass guitar 2006-2007)
- Website: Letters and Colours on Myspace

Letters & Colours were an English band from Sheffield, England, who became known for their combination of early 1980s new wave and disco beats. They gained recognition along with the New Yorkshire and nu rave scenes, and groups such as Bloc Party, Interpol, Editors and The Departure. They list The Cure, Depeche Mode and The Smiths as influences and were compared to such groups, as well as Joy Division, Echo & the Bunnymen, Bauhaus, Artery and Comsat Angels. Letters & Colours combined a heavy, repetitive rhythm section with lush, melodic guitar and haunting vocals. This created a bleak sound with a danceable quality, often referred to as "noir pop". The band was formed in 2003 as a two-piece, before extending to four members, ultimately splitting in August 2007.

== Career ==
Letters & Colours were formed in late 2003 by Sheffield Hallam University students David Jaques (guitar, programming) and Gerry Poole (vocals, keyboards, guitar). They played shows throughout the north of England including performances at The Leadmill in Sheffield and Barfly in Liverpool, building up a strong fan base. Combining live shows and the release of free recordings made available through Myspace, the band built a large following making them one of the first groups, along with Arctic Monkeys and Clap Your Hands Say Yeah to use the Internet to swell their fan base. The first shows used the combination of guitars, programming and vocals to create tight, epic music but could lack direction because of the limitations of programmed drums in a live context.

Over the next year, the line-up was extended to create more flexibility in live performances, initially drafting in Ian Baxter on bass guitar, shortly followed by Paul Roberts on drums. The band gelled quickly as a four-piece inspiring a change in style. The new sound was accompanied by a faster tempo and more exciting live performances, adding a pop edge to the band's sound. With new songs and a greater live presence, Letters & Colours continued to build their fan base and played with groups such as Harrisons and Little Man Tate, and played at the In the City in Manchester in 2005.

At the beginning of 2006, Baxter left the band to concentrate on drumming in another Sheffield band, The Yell. The band had organised a national tour and single to be released on their own label, Dead Product, in March 2006, but with the departure of Baxter the band's plans were put in jeopardy. The band recorded the single without him, and toured with Miller playing bass guitar for certain songs. The single and tour were a success, spurring the band to carry on and find a new bass guitarist, Ric Griffiths.

Within weeks of completing the new line-up, the group developed several new songs and played their first gig at The Plug, with New Young Pony Club. During 2006 and 2007, Letters & Colours played headline shows all over the UK including The Fly in London, The Faversham in Leeds, The Barfly in Liverpool and Sheffield University's Fuzz Club, as well as Mean Fiddler's Carling Weekend. Letters & Colours also appeared on BBC's Look North regional news programme, with The Pigeon Detectives, in the press coverage for the 2006 Carling Weekend. The band also received critical acclaim from DJs on Xfm, Radio 1, 6Music, BBC Raw Talent and were one of Steve Lamacq's top tips for 2007.

The band's song "Alpha" was included in Alt Delete's era defining compilation Digital Penetration in 2006. In April 2007, the band released "Gaunt/Plan A" on Mother Tongue. The song was recorded by the Sheffield musician/producer Alan Smyth and was Steve Lamacq's single of the week on his Monday night Radio 1 new music show.

Despite continuing to receive critical acclaim and an ever-increasing fan base, the band split up in summer 2007, believing they had achieved all they could in their current guise.

== Recordings ==
Singles
"Confrontation"
Released:18 March 2006 by Dead Product (Cat No: DP003). Track listing: A - "Confrontation"/AA- "Bigger Than Life"

"Gaunt"
Released:30 April 2007 by Mother Tongue (Cat No: MOTH18S). Track listing: A - "Gaunt"/AA- "Plan A"

Other releases
"Chase The Bull"
Released: June 2006 from demo album

"Alpha"
Released: 7 October 2006 from the album Digital Penetration Vol 1, released by Alt Delete (Cat No: altdel004)

"Celibate Man"
Released: 2007

"Syntax"
Released: 30 May 2007 from the album Across The Pennines II, released by Across The Pennines (Cat No: ATP002)

"Where Cynics Prosper"
Released: March 2007 by Mother Tongue as a radio promo only

"Alpha" and "Syntax" were also released as a radio promotional singles by Dead Product (DP004)

Letters & Colours also gave away free mp3s of unreleased material through their Myspace and mailing lists. These songs can be found on the Internet.

== After the split ==
After the split, Gerry Poole produced material under the name of Horen and Paul Roberts played drums with Penny Broadhurst and the Maffickers until early 2010.

In early 2011, Poole was diagnosed with stomach cancer. An article where he talks about his experience of claiming Disability Living Allowance appeared in the Guardian. He died on 23 May 2012.
