= Camber Sands =

Beach in East Sussex, England

- Sand Dunes
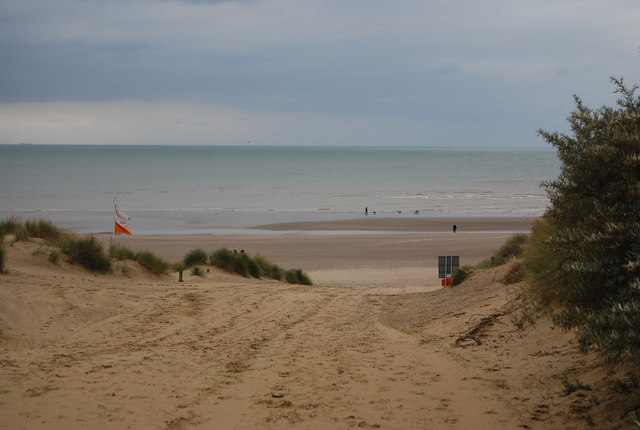
- The beach at Camber Sands

- Location within East Sussex
- Coordinates: 50°55′59.5″N 0°47′45.9″E
- Location: East Sussex, England, UK

Camber Sands is a beach in East Sussex, England, in the village of Camber, near Rye. It is the only sand dune system in East Sussex. Located east of the estuary of the River Rother at Rye Bay, it stretches 3 miles (4.8 km) to just beyond the Kent border, where shingle (pebbles) take over again. It is one of three stretches of sand above the high tide mark east of Poole Bay on England's south coast, the others being West Wittering and Avon Beach. Two holiday resorts near Camber Sands were operated by Pontins and Parkdeans resorts, just off New Lydd Road and Lydd Road, respectively, in the adjoining village of Camber (the Pontins site closed on 30 November 2023).

== Dunes ==
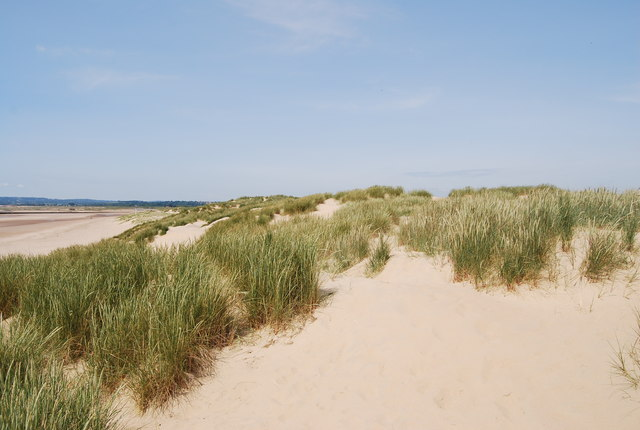
Camber Sands dunes

A large section of the western end of the dunes lies within the Camber Sands and Rye Saltings Site of Special Scientific Interest (SSSI), while the rest is designated a Site of Nature Conservation Importance.

The dunes are getting larger by accretion. The dunes are managed to prevent problems with wind-blown sand.

== Second World War and inland to the east ==
The dunes were fortified and used for exercises in the Second World War. There is a roughly square MoD danger area and base inland of the east of the area. The dunes resemble topographically those seen in parts of Normandy and also in challenging desert terrain. Similar training facilities exist at Braunton in North Devon, in Scotland, and in Pembrokeshire.

== Transport ==
=== Parking ===
Three main car parks co-exist. Western car park on New Lydd road has a large overflow one, all opposite Central car park and its overflow. A third, smaller car park is on Old Lydd road.

Central has main access to the beach; one can negotiate quite long, steep sandy paths over dunes from Western car park. These paths are unsuitable for prams, or wheelchairs. The Western car park closes at 8pm in the summer.

=== Camber Sands Station ===
Camber Sands railway station was the terminus of the Rye and Camber Tramway. It opened on 13 July 1908 and closed, with the line, in September 1939.

== Sporting activities ==
The beach has become a popular location for kitesurfing, kite landboarding and kite buggying due to its sand and favourable wind conditions. Kite launches are only allowed in the designated area at the eastern end of the beach near the Jury's Gap car park. There is also an annual professional darts tournament held at the Pontins resort by the British Darts Organisation.

== Drownings ==
In 2016, a total of seven men drowned at Camber Sands, five of them on one day. There was controversy over the lack of lifeguards, and inquests returned verdicts of death by misadventure.

At low tide, remains of a shipwreck can be seen, tentatively identified as the brig "Avon" which sank in 1852.

== Cultural references ==
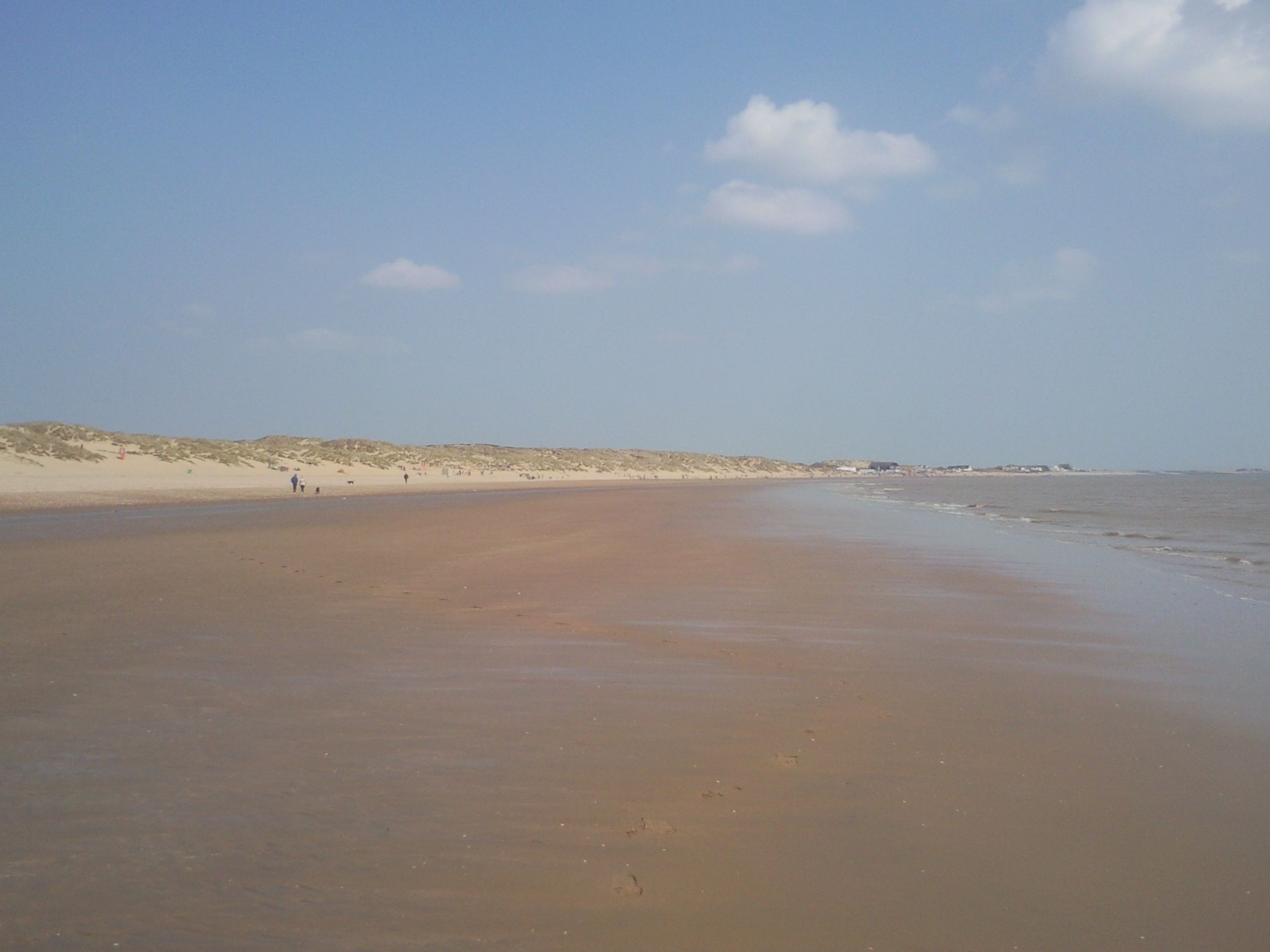
Camber Sands at Low Tide

Camber Sands, with its wide bay and large dune system, has been used in a variety of creative media.

=== Films ===
The beach was used in the 1958 film Dunkirk starring John Mills to recreate Operation Dynamo. They were used again as Normandy beaches during D-Day in the 1962 film The Longest Day.

Follow That Camel was shot here during the early months of 1967, with Camber Sands representing the Sahara Desert, although filming had to be stopped several times because the dunes were covered in snow.

The Invisible Woman (filmed in 2012, released in 2013), a period drama about the life of Nelly Ternan, has several scenes on the sand.

Scenes from The Loneliness of the Long Distance Runner were filmed here in early 1962. The film's main character (the runner), Colin Smith, portrayed by actor Tom Courtenay, and his friend take their girlfriends to Skegness for a weekend, and some scenes were filmed on this beach and in the dunes.

=== TV Shows ===
The Inbetweeners - season one episode five. The boys go to the 'Camber Sands' caravan club meetup.

=== Music ===
Camber Sands is mentioned in various songs such as "Pulling Mussels (From the Shell)" by Squeeze (also covered by Head Automatica), "Diamonds and Pearls" by The Holloways, "Heavyweight Champion of the World" by Reverend and The Makers and "Caravan" by Nick Heyward. It was also used as a title to Fatboy Slim's EP single Camber Sands.

Feeder's 2003 video for "Forget About Tomorrow", was partially shot on the beach. Nine years later, Feeder referenced Camber Sands in "Oh My", the opening track of their Generation Freakshow album.

The 2007 song "Heavyweight Champion of the World" by Reverend & The Makers mentions that the closest the protagonist got to China was a "week in Camber Sands".

The song "On Camber Sands" appears on Gordon Giltrap's album Troubadour.

The cover of the 1980 LP record Beat Boys In The Jet Age by mod revival band, The Lambrettas, was photographed on Camber Sands.

The cover of the Bucks Fizz album I Hear Talk, was photographed at Camber Sands.

The cover of Dream Theater's 1997 album Falling Into Infinity was photographed at Camber Sands by English graphic designer Storm Thorgerson.

In the song (We Are) Mod Mock Goth by The Fall the first line is Take viagra, go to Camber Sands.

=== Visual art ===
Artists the Boyle Family made some of their first casts using resin and fibreglass on the beach at Camber Sands in 1966. These initial studies – some of which were unsuccessful – culminated in the Tidal Series of 1969 in which 14 separate casts were made of the same 150 cm × 150 cm (59.1 in × 59.1 in) area of beach.
