= The State of Things (album) =

Studio album by Reverend and the Makers
- Released: 17 September 2007
- Recorded: 2006–2007, Sheffield, England
- Genre: Alternative rock, electronic
- Length: 41:43
- Label: Wall of Sound

Reverend and the Makers chronology
The State of Things (2007)	A French Kiss in the Chaos (2009)

Singles from The State of Things
- 1. "Heavyweight Champion of the World" Released: 2007; 2. "He Said He Loved Me" Released: 2007; 3. "Open Your Window" Released: 2007; 4. "Sundown on the Empire / 18-30 / The Machine – Remixes" Released: 2008

Professional ratings
Review scores
Source	Rating
AllMusic	link
Drowned in Sound	4/10 link
The Guardian	link
stv.tv	link
Uncut	link
NME	5/10

The State of Things is the debut studio album by English alternative rock band Reverend and The Makers. It reached number 5 in the UK Albums Chart, selling just over 25,000 copies in its first week.

== Critical reception ==
The album received positive reviews, with Uncut saying "the record is a tribute to McClure's charisma and unswerving self-belief". The first single, "Heavyweight Champion of the World", reached the top ten and was played on BBC Radio 1's Live Lounge. Other songs on the album, notably "He Said He Loved Me" and "The Machine" become fan favourites and were played in their concerts, including the band's three night run at Wembley Stadium supporting Oasis.

The album includes seven songs that were previously released as free downloads, in a collection of demos entitled Ten Songs produced by Alan Smyth.

The single "Open Your Window" was featured on the soundtrack to the football video game FIFA 09.

== Track listing ==
All tracks are written by Jon McClure, co-writers noted.

No.	Title	Additional musicians	Length
1.	"The State of Things" (Hampton)		3:01
2.	"The Machine" (Turner)	Vocals – Alex Turner	3:50
3.	"Heavyweight Champion of the World" (Cosens/Smyth)	Congas – Bert 'Bongo Bert' Rogers	3:25
4.	"Bandits" (Rowley/Smith)	Vocals – Tim Hampton and James O'Hara	2:37
5.	"Open Your Window" (Cosens/Smyth)	Vocals – Steve Edwards; Guitar – Alan Smyth	4:03
6.	"Sex with the Ex"		4:07
7.	"18-30" (Cosens)		3:15
8.	"He Said He Loved Me" (Turner/Smyth)	Chewing – Alan Smyth; Guitar – Alex Turner; Co-lead Vocals – Laura Manuel	2:54
9.	"What the Milkman Saw" (Cosens/Smyth)		2:56
10.	"Sundown on the Empire" (Cosens)	Recorder – Tia Coakley	4:00
11.	"Miss Brown" (Rowley)	Vocals – Steve Edwards	3:27
12.	"Armchair Detective" (Turner/Smyth)	Vocals – Mike Hughes; Violin – Stephen Rocheford	4:13

== Charts ==
Chart performance for The State of Things
Chart (2007)	Peak position
Dutch Alternative Albums (MegaCharts)	21
Scottish Albums (OCC)	8
UK Albums (OCC)	5
UK Independent Albums (OCC)	1

== Certifications ==
Certifications for The State of Things
Region	Certification	Certified units/sales
United Kingdom (BPI)	Gold	100,000^{^}
^{^} Shipments figures based on certification alone.
