= ThirtyTwo =

Studio album by Reverend and the Makers
- Released: 24 February 2014
- Length: 34:35
- Label: Cooking Vinyl
- Producer: Youth; James Welsh; Reverend and the Makers

Reverend and the Makers chronology
@Reverend Makers (2012)	ThirtyTwo (2014)	Mirrors (2015)

Professional ratings
Review scores
Source	Rating
musicOMH	3/5 stars

ThirtyTwo is the fourth studio album by Reverend and the Makers, released on 24 February 2014 by Cooking Vinyl in the UK. The album title refers to various different things: the age of lead singer Jon McClure at the time of the album's release, his father's favourite lottery number and number of the bus route near McClure's house. The album peaked at number 13 on the UK Albums Chart, making it their second highest charting album behind their debut The State of Things.

== Track listing ==
All tracks are written by Reverend and the Makers. McClure takes lead vocals on all tracks, sharing with Steve Edwards on "I Spy" and with Joe Carnall on "Different Trains".

ThirtyTwo track listing
No.	Title	Length
1.	"Detonator"	2:19
2.	"I Spy"	2:49
3.	"The Devil's Radio"	3:30
4.	"Nostalgia"	3:30
5.	"Happy Song"	2:51
6.	"Different Trains"	3:05
7.	"Time"	3:27
8.	"Old Enough (To Know Better)"	3:06
9.	"Play Me"	2:54
10.	"The Only One"	3:10
11.	"Your Girl"	3:54
Total length:		34:35

== Charts ==
Chart performance for ThirtyTwo
Chart (2014)	Peak position
Scottish Albums (OCC)	23
UK Albums (OCC)	13
