= A French Kiss in the Chaos =

Studio album by Reverend and the Makers
- Released: 27 July 2009
- Recorded: 2008–2009
- Genre: Indie rock
- Length: 39:35
- Label: Wall of Sound

Reverend and the Makers chronology
The State of Things (2007)	A French Kiss in the Chaos (2009)	Reverend and the Makers: Live in the UK (2009)

Singles from A French Kiss in the Chaos
- 1. "Silence is Talking" Released: 20 July 2009; 2. "No Soap (in a Dirty War)" Released: 14 September 2009

A French Kiss in the Chaos is the second album by Reverend and the Makers, which was released on 27 July 2009. The album's first single was "Silence is Talking" released on 20 July 2009, and the second album single "No Soap (in a Dirty War)" was released on 14 September 2009. Some of the other songs on the album such as "The End" and "Hidden Persuaders" were debuted live on Oasis' Dig Out Your Soul Tour when the band was supporting them along with Kasabian and The Enemy, most notably at the Wembley Stadium 3 night run.

Professional ratings
Review scores
Source	Rating
NME	(6/10)
Drowned in Sound	(4/10) link
Planet Sound	(7/10)
AllMusic	link

== Reception ==
The album has received mixed reviews from critics, notably Metacritic which currently holds the album at 58/100 based on 7 critical reviews. The BBC also gave the album a mixed review, claiming that the album is an "accomplished indie album" if only its maker didn't need to resort to "hackneyed generalisations about the media having 'license to print lies as facts' and ridiculous alliteration like 'Professor Pickles prescribing me Prozac pills'".

The Guardian backed this review up by stating other than "the galloping "Hidden Persuaders" and the funk groove of "No Wood Just Trees", this fails to excite."

However, Contact Music stated the album was "decent" and stated the first single "Silence is Talking" rivals that of the band's breakthrough single Heavyweight Champion of the World and the album's finale, "Hard Time for Dreamers" was "breathtaking" and its greatness was "undeniable".

Also, The Telegraph was extremely complimentary about the album, suggesting the album is a "cross between the arch cleverness of Blur and crowd pleasing instincts of Oasis". The newspaper awarded the album 3/5 stars.

== Track listing ==
All tracks are written by Jon McClure.

No.	Title	Length
1.	"Silence is Talking"	5:41
2.	"Hidden Persuaders"	4:02
3.	"No Wood Just Trees"	3:33
4.	"Professor Pickles"	2:58
5.	"Long Long Time"	2:35
6.	"No Soap (in a Dirty War)"	4:08
7.	"Manifesto / People Shapers"	5:36
8.	"Mermaids"	3:11
9.	"The End"	3:54
10.	"Hard Time for Dreamers"	4:22

iTunes bonus tracks
No.	Title	Length
11.	"Bird of Prey"	3:33
12.	"More Than Yourself"	3:30

== Charts ==
Chart performance for A French Kiss in the Chaos
Chart (2009)	Peak position
Scottish Albums (Official Charts)	40
UK Albums (Official Charts)	19
