= SDY =

SDY may refer to:

- Sandy railway station, Bedfordshire, England (Station code)
- Sidney-Richland Municipal Airport, Montana, United States (IATA Airport Code)
- the Amtrak station code for Schenectady, NY
- Smokers Die Younger, an English rock band from Sheffield
