= Made in Sheffield =

Made in Sheffield is a documentary film on the history of the music scene in the city of Sheffield, South Yorkshire, England from 1975 until 1983. The film was directed Eve Wood and produced by Sheffield Vision and Slackjaw Film in 2001. It features bands such as the Human League, Cabaret Voltaire, Clock DVA, Pulp (who would not find success until 1994), ABC, and Heaven 17.

== Bands featured ==
- 2.3
- ABC
- Artery
- Cabaret Voltaire
- Clock DVA
- Comsat Angels
- Def Leppard
- The Extras
- The Future
- Heaven 17
- The Human League
- I'm So Hollow
- Pulp
- The Stuntkites
- They Must Be Russians
- Vice Versa
