= Dits from the Commuter Belt =

Dits From The Commuter Belt

Studio album by Bromheads Jacket
- Released: 13 November 2006
- Recorded: 2006
- Genre: Indie rock
- Length: 56:42
- Label: Marquis Cha Cha
- Producer: Ross Orton, Steve Mackey

Professional ratings
Review scores
Source	Rating
The Guardian	1/5 stars
Drowned in Sound	(7/10)
Play Louder	3/5 stars

Dits From The Commuter Belt is the name of the debut album by the Sheffield band Bromheads Jacket. The album was released on November 13, 2006 in the UK on the Marquis Cha Cha record label. It was leaked onto the Internet on November 10.

== Track listing ==
1. "Orton's Intro" – 1:25
2. "What Ifs & Maybes" – 1:51
3. "Woolley Bridge" – 2:42
4. "Going Round to Have a Word" – 2:38
5. "Poppy Bird" – 3:35
6. "Fight Music for the Fight" – 2:53
7. "Lesley Parlafitt" – 1:32
8. "One Nautical Mile" – 2:44
9. "Rosey Lee" – 3:05
10. "He Likes Them Airbrushed" – 3:03
11. ""My Prime Time Kid"" – 2:30
12. "Trip to The Golden Arches" – 2:35
13. "Hazy in Yateley" - "Homicidal Psycho Jungle Cat" – 26:30

Note: "Homicidal Psycho Jungle Cat" is a hidden instrumental track at end of "Hazy in Yateley"

"Fight Music for the Fight" was in the games Burnout Paradise and Burnout Dominator.
