= Standard Fare =

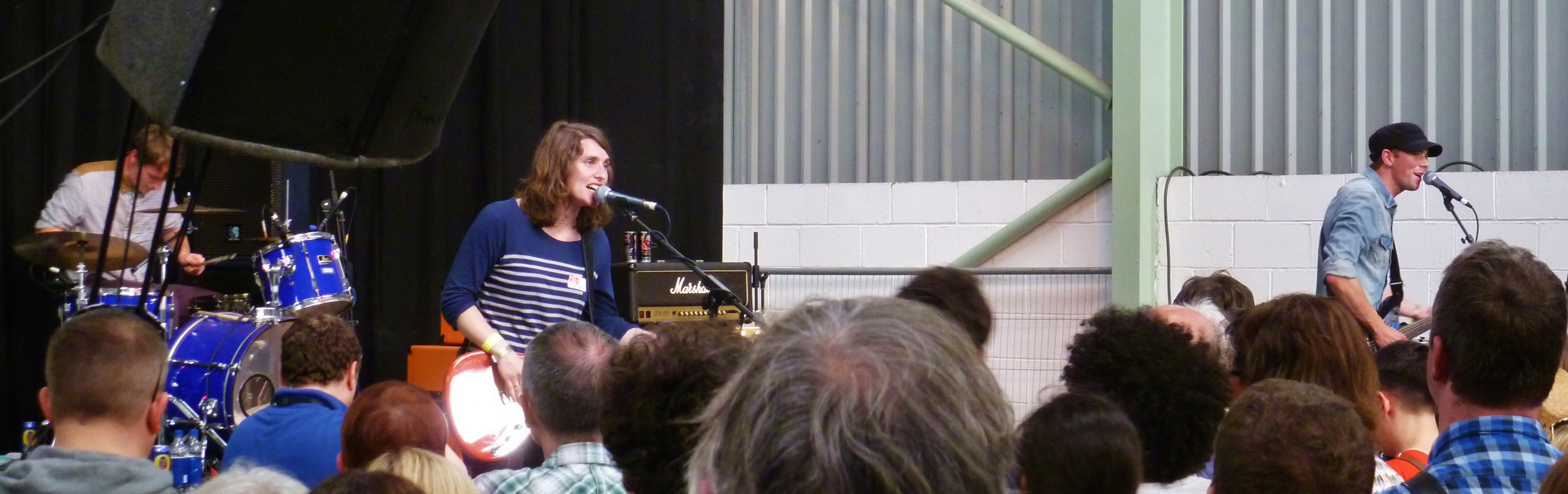

Background information
- Origin: Sheffield, England
- Genres: Indie pop
- Years active: 2005–2013
- Labels: Thee Sheffield Phonographic Corporation, Melodic Records, Bar/None Records
- Spinoffs: Mammoth Penguins
- Past members: Emma Kupa; Danny How; Andy Beswick

Standard Fare were a British three-piece indie-pop band based in Sheffield, The band were formed in 2005 and comprised members Emma Kupa, Danny How, and Andy Beswick. Standard Fare were named after a sign Emma saw on a bus in Newcastle. The band's sound drew upon their influences of soft rock and punk but is often linked to the sounds of C86 era bands.

== History ==
Emma, Dan and Andy are all from north Derbyshire. After practising in Buxton for a couple of years the trio moved their rehearsals to Yellow Arch Studios in Sheffield, in 2007. The band received their first national radio play in early 2008 after the BBC's Huw Stephens received a copy of their demo Get On Board through the post. This was followed by them playing a showcase gig for Huw Stephens a few months later at The Social in London.

In summer 2008, Standard Fare were signed to Thee SPC, an independent Sheffield label. A recording session followed and March 2009 saw the band's first release, a split single on 7” vinyl with Sheffield band Slow Down Tallahassee, featuring the song "Dancing". A second 7” single, "Fifteen" was released on Thee SPC in January 2010. An agreement was signed with the Manchester-based label, Melodic to co-release the band's debut album The Noyelle Beat. The album was released in both the UK and US in March 2010, with the US release under Bar None Records. This was followed by a 7” release of "Philadelphia". The Noyelle Beat featured songs recorded at Stockport's LP Studios, and at 2Fly Studios in Sheffield with Alan Smyth.

A second split single, this time with Boston-based band One Happy Island was released in January 2011.

Standard Fare's second studio album, Out Of Sight, Out Of Town, was released in December 2011. Reviews were positive, with the BBC's Darren Loucaidis describing the record as "clear cut fun", Drowned In Sound's Alex Yau noting the record's new found "maturity", and musicOMH's Helen Clarke claiming it to be "a late contender for indiepop album of the year".

In January 2013, the band announced they were to split up, issuing a statement which said that "after nine years of playing together, we are finishing Standard Fare on a high". They also said they parted on friendly terms, and would play two final gigs in Sheffield and London in February and March.

== Critical acclaim ==
- “The best and most enjoyable aspects of indie guitar music” - The Sunday Times
- “Close to perfection” - Artrocker
- “The Noyelle Beat is one of the best indiepop records of the year.” - Brooklyn Vegan
- "Best Album and Best Live Act of 2010" – Sounds XP
- 'Dancing' – one of The New York Times' best songs of 2010
- 'Fifteen' – one of Drowned in Sound's singles of the year 2010

== Touring and festivals ==
Standard Fare toured extensively around the UK between 2008 and 2010. They travelled to the US in March 2010 where they toured along the East Coast of the United States before heading to play at SXSW, Austin, Texas. They returned to the US in September 2010 and played at Athens Popfest, Athens, Georgia. Standard Fare have also appeared on the bills at London Popfest, Les Sons du Nord, Noyelle-sous-Lens, France, Latitude Festival, Indietracks, Tramlines, In The city, and Farmfest.

== Discography ==
=== Studio albums ===
==== The Noyelle Beat (2010) ====
1. "Love Doesn't Just Stop"
2. "Nuit Avec Une Ami"
3. "Philadelphia"
4. "Wrong Kind of Trouble"
5. "Fifteen"
6. "Lets Get Back Together"
7. "Secret Little Sweetheart"
8. "I Know it's Hard"
9. "Married"
10. "Edges & Corners"
11. "Dancing"
12. "Be into Us"
13. "Wow"

==== Out of Sight, Out of Town (2011) ====
1. "The Look of Lust"
2. "051107"
3. "Suitcase"
4. "Dead Future"
5. "Kicking Puddles"
6. "Darth Vader"
7. "Bad Temper"
8. "Older Women"
9. "Call Me Up"
10. "Half Sister"
11. "Early That Night"
12. "Crystal Palatial"

=== Singles ===
- "Fifteen" - Thee SPC, 7", MP3 (January 2010) (b/w "Understand")
- "Philadelphia" - Thee SPC, 7", MP3 (July 2010) (b/w "Don't Tell")
- "Suitcase" - Thee SPC, 7", MP3 (March 2011) (b/w "Nine Days". The digital download version of the single contains an extra exclusive track titled "Marker Pens")
- "At The Lake" - WIAIWYA, 7", MP3 (June 2012) (b/w "Girlfriend" and "Keeps Me Going")
- "Rumours" - Kingfisher Bluez, 7", MP3 (April 2013) (b/w "Out of Sight")

=== Split releases ===
- "Dancing" - Thee SPC, 7", MP3 (2009) (split single with Slow Down Tallahassee)
- "Standard Fare on One Happy Island" - Thee SPC, 7", MP3 (January 2011) (split single with One Happy Island)

== Music videos ==
- "Philadelphia" Video
- "Vaya Vaya Mexico" (World Cup song)
- "Dancing" (live)

== Band members ==
- Emma Kupa
- Danny How
- Andy Beswick
