= He Said He Loved Me =

2007 single by Reverend and the Makers

Single by Reverend and the Makers

from the album The State of Things
- B-side: "You Get So Alone Sometimes It Just Makes Sense"; "God Is in the TV"; 1. "Just Like His Dad"
- Released: 3 September 2007
- Length: 2:54
- Label: Wall of Sound
- Songwriter(s): Alan Smyth; Jon McClure; Alex Turner
- Producer(s): Jagz Kooner

Reverend and the Makers singles chronology
| "Heavyweight Champion of the World" (2007) | "He Said He Loved Me" (2007) | "Open Your Window" (2007) |

"He Said He Loved Me" is a song by English rock band Reverend and the Makers from their 2007 debut album, The State of Things. The song features Jon McClure and Laura Manuel on lead vocals. It was released on 26 August 2007 as a digital download and on 3 September 2007 as a physical single. The song reached number 16 on the UK Singles Chart the same month.

== Song information ==
"He Said He Loved Me" was co-written by Alan Smyth, Jon McClure, and Alex Turner of fellow English rock band Arctic Monkeys. Like Reverend and the Makers' debut single, "Heavyweight Champion of the World", it is also attributed to Alan Smyth, who produced the original demos for the band. The song and B-side "You Get So Alone It Just Makes Sense" both appear on the demo release Ten Songs; the latter track was taken from the title of a collection of poems by Charles Bukowski. The other B-side, "God Is in the TV", was originally a song by McClure's previous band, 1984. Both B-sides were co-written by Ed Cosens.

== Track listings ==
UK and Australian CD single

1. "He Said He Loved Me"
2. "You Get So Alone Sometimes It Just Makes Sense"
3. "God Is in the TV"

UK 7-inch single

A1. "He Said He Loved Me"
B1. "You Get So Alone Sometimes It Just Makes Sense"
B2. "Just Like His Dad"

== Charts ==
| Chart (2007) | Peak position |
|---|---|
| Scotland (OCC) | 18 |
| UK Singles (OCC) | 16 |
| UK Indie (OCC) | 1 |
