= O Fracas =

O Fracas were an English indie/alternative rock band from Leeds, West Yorkshire. They originally formed in 2001 and were active until 2009. They are sometimes regarded as members of the New Yorkshire music scene and appeared regularly alongside other hotly tipped local bands including ¡Forward, Russia!, This Et Al, The Sunshine Underground, The Pigeon Detectives and Wild Beasts. During promotional tours, the band supported Mystery Jets, The Young Knives and The Noisettes, also making appearances at Leeds Festival in 2005 and 2006.

== Band members ==
Principal songwriter Ben Partridge (vocals and guitar) and guitarist Alex Farrar met at secondary school and played in an earlier incarnation of the band alongside James Burkitt (drums and piano) while still at school. Former Vatican Jet member Matt Flint (bass guitar and vocals) joined in 2007 and the line-up was completed in 2008 with the addition of Ben Farber (keyboards and percussion).

== Career ==
Two singles were released on the Marquis Cha Cha record label before the release of their debut album. Their debut single, double A-side "Zeroes & Ones / What Jim Hears", was released in September 2005 followed by "Follow Sue" in April 2006. Both singles received glowing reviews from local and national press, including Leeds Music Scene, Artrocker, Fact Magazine and Drowned in Sound.

Their debut album Fits & Starts was released on I Can Count Music in May 2008. It received 7/10 in NME, describing it as an "engaging album of post punk, nutty folk and avant garde rock". The Guardian hailed the release as "the first great record of 2008".

As regional winners of the Red Stripe Music Awards 2008, the band played at the national final at London's Kentish Town Forum. Their last major appearance was at Diesel's XXX Party in New York, alongside other British bands Hot Chip and Franz Ferdinand.
