= I'm So Hollow =

English post-punk band

- Origin: Sheffield, England
- Genres: Post-punk
- Years active: 1978–1981
- Labels: Hollogram; Illuminated
- Past members: Jane Wilson; Rod Leigh; Gary Marsden; Yosef Sawicki

I'm So Hollow were an English post-punk band from Sheffield, England, active from 1978 to 1981. They were part of the Sheffield scene in England, alongside such bands as Clock DVA, Comsat Angels, Artery, The Human League and Vice Versa.

== Line-up ==
The band's line-up was: Jane Wilson (vocals, keyboards), Rod Leigh (vocals, guitar), Gary Marsden (bass), and Yosef Sawicki (drums).

== History ==
I'm So Hollow played their first gig opening for Clock DVA in Sheffield's Penthouse Club. Their highest profile gig was at the Futurama Festival in Leeds on 13 September 1980. Their performance of the song "Touch" is seen in Eve Wood's documentary film Made in Sheffield (2001).

The band appeared on several compilations and recorded a John Peel session in 1980. They released their first and only single "Dreams to Fill the Vacuum" in 1980, and, feeling they had achieved their ambitions with the recording of the album Emotion/Sound/Motion, split up shortly before its release in 1981.

== Discography ==
=== Albums ===
- Emotion/Sound/Motion (1981, Illuminated Records [LP])

=== Singles ===
- "Dreams to Fill the Vacuum"/"Distraction" (1980, Hollogram Records [7"])

=== Compilation appearances ===
- "I Don't Know" on The First Fifteen Minutes (1980, Neutron [EP])
- "Touch" on Bouquet of Steel (1980, Aardvark [LP])
- "I Don't Know" on Hicks from the Sticks (1980, Rockburgh [LP])
