= The Oxfam Glamour Models =

Noise rock band from Middlesbrough, England

Oxfam Glamour Models
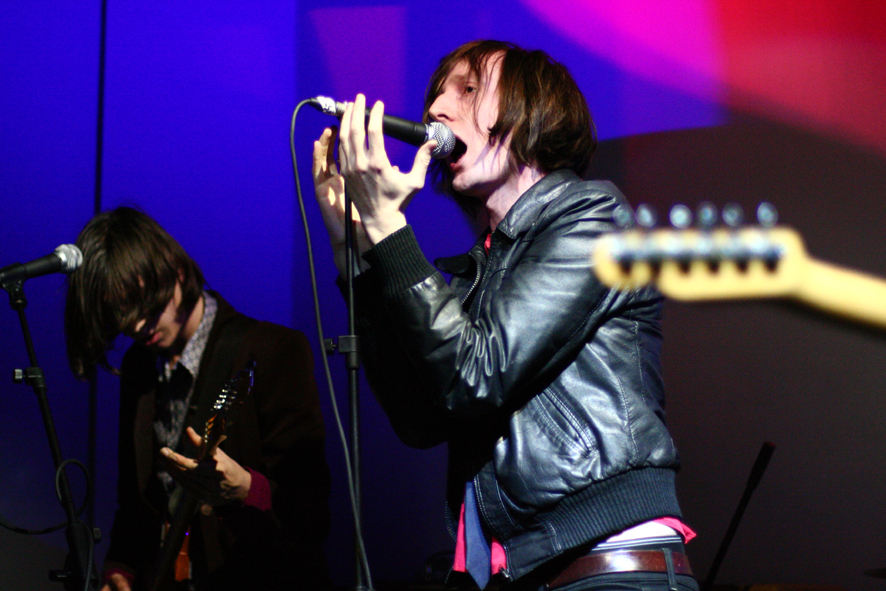

Background information
- Origin: Middlesbrough, England
- Genres: Noise rock, indie rock, post-punk
- Years active: 2005–2007, 2011–2013
- Label: Marquis Cha Cha
- Members: Emmett; Paul Dye; Ryan Pilot; Oli Heffernan
- Past members: Peachy; Luke Tanner; Calum Bartoli

The Oxfam Glamour Models are a noise rock band from Middlesbrough in the North East of England. They signed to Marquis Cha Cha records in 2006 but split in 2007. As of August 2011 they are once again active. Members include Emmett (Vocals), Paul Dye (Guitar), Peachy (Guitar)(2004–2007) and Ryan Pilot (Drums). As of 2012 Oli Heffernan (Year of Birds, Idiot Savant, British Lichen Society) has been playing bass for the band.

Their first single, "Kick Out The Grams" was an NME runner-up single of the week. It was described as "energetic and inventive and wild-eyed and noisy and suggestive of glamour and attitude", with Emmet's vocals described as "the sound of a sleazy Brett Anderson being injected with Johnny Rotten's bile". Following the single the band embarked on a lengthy tour of the UK and an appearance at the 2006 London Calling Festival at the Paradiso Amsterdamn with label mates Bromheads Jacket.

Having appeared on the cover of both the NME and Artrocker in the summer by November 2006, they released the follow-up to "Kick out the Grams", "8 Cans Yeah", described by Drowned in Sound as "a lo-fi mashup of The Rakes on a bender and Eddie Argos with the rage".

After more gigs, the band arranged studio time to record tracks for a possible album. However, these tracks were scrapped and the band finally decided not to make an album or any other future release.

Following a year of line up problems, relocations and lost momentum, The Oxfam Glamour Models split in December 2007.

Paul Dye and Peter Holt went on to form, British Lichen Society. Paul was later replaced by Oli Heffernan, who has since replaced Luke Tanner in the current Oxfam Glamour Models line up.

Paul Emmett and Luke Tanner went on to form, Education Education Education. Ryan Pilot went on to form Fleckt Pets as a guitarist and then his current band The Shakin' Nightmares as vocalist and guitarist.

In July 2011 a new Facebook was set up to announce a reformation. In November, a gig was announced at the Georgian Theatre in Stockton on Tees for 16 December, the same venue they played their last gig almost exactly four years earlier.

== Discography ==
- "Kick Out the Grams" (2006), Marquis Cha Cha
- "8 Cans Yeah" (2006), Marquis Cha Cha
