= I Set The Sea On Fire =

British alternative rock band

- Origin: Sheffield, England
- Genres: Indie rock; alternative rock; funk rock
- Years active: 2010–present
- Members: Billy Washington; Pete Jenkins; Meg Washington; Josh Knight; Dug Shipstone; Emily Compton
- Website: www.istsof.co.uk

I Set The Sea On Fire are a British alternative rock band from Sheffield, England. The band are well known for their single "Tastes Like Funk", which got airplay on BBC Radio 1 and BBC Radio 2. Combining traditional indie with elements of funk, grunge and hip hop, I Set The Sea On Fire are making a name for themselves as the next massive sound out of Sheffield. With four-part harmonies, a trumpet, trombone and flute alongside the traditional indie band, the sound is hard to describe, but they've settled with comparing it to an offshore oil rig explosion, but with fewer screams and a lot more trumpet. Having shared the stage with bands such as Heaven 17, Buzzcocks and Dog Is Dead, the band are well known for their massive live shows, which have been described as a "Powerfully energetic set which could get the dead dancing, but with the most beautiful harmonies I've heard live in a long time".

== History ==
The band formed in 2010, and got signed to Sound Hub Records in 2013, creating three singles with the label; "Monsters", "Florida Horrors" and "Low". The band then moved to Alya Records in 2015, and started working on their debut album Sleep Now Suburbia.

After parting ways from alya records in 2017, I Set The Sea On Fire have gone on to release several new singles with an album slated for release in 2026.

== Recognition ==
The band have received praise from Dermot O'Leary on BBC Radio 2, as well as airplay by Huw Stephens on BBC Radio 1. In 2016 the band have played many major UK Festivals including Liverpool Sound City, Y Not Festival and Kaya Festival. The band have also received reviews from prestigious reviewers including Sound & Silence and Anthem Reviews.

== Members ==
- Billy Washington – lead vocals, lead guitar
- Pete Jenkins – bass, vocals
- Meg Washington – Flute, vocals
- Josh Knight – Drums

Album session musicians

- Thomas Mercer – Trombone (Sleep Now Suburbia)
- Kat Bandmann – Cello (Sleep Now Suburbia)

Past members

- Josh Soden (Drums 2010–2012)
- Joss Allsopp (Trumpet 2010–2012)
- Ellie Rockliffe (Trumpet 2012–2014)
- Alex Burns (Trumpet 2015)
- Matt Price (Trumpet 2015–2018)
- Emily Compton – Trumpet (2017 - 2019)
- Dug Shipstone – Trombone (2017 - 2019)

== Discography ==
=== Studio albums ===
- Sleep Now Suburbia (2016)

=== Singles ===
- "Beff Jezos" (2025)
- "Blunderbuss" (2025)
- "Kill Your Senators" (2019)
- "Accidental Sex Jam" (2019)
- "Florida Horrors Pt.II" (2018)
- "Iodine" (2017)
- "Tastes Like Funk" (2015)
- "Low" (2015)
- "Florida Horrors" (2014)
- "Pareidolia" (2014)
- "Monsters" (2013)
