= @Reverend Makers =

@Reverend_Makers

Studio album by Reverend and the Makers
- Released: 18 June 2012
- Recorded: 2011–2012
- Genre: Indietronica, indie rock, alternative rock, electronica
- Label: Cooking Vinyl
- Producer: James Dring, Youth

Reverend and the Makers chronology
Reverend and the Makers: Live in the UK (2009)	@Reverend_Makers (2012)	ThirtyTwo (2014)

Singles from @Reverend_Makers
- 1. "Bassline" Released: 13 February 2012; 2. "The Wrestler" Released: 14 May 2012; 3. "Out of the Shadows" Released: August 2012

Professional ratings
Aggregate scores
Source	Rating
Metacritic	55/100
Review scores
Source	Rating
AllMusic	3/5 stars
Drowned in Sound	1/10
The Independent	4/5 stars
MusicOMH	3.5/5 stars
NME	6/10
Q	1/5 stars

@Reverend_Makers is the third studio album by English band Reverend and the Makers, released on 18 June 2012. The album's lead single was "Bassline" and was released on 13 February 2012, via free download from the band's Facebook page. The band toured the UK following the album release, after a stint supporting Noel Gallagher's High Flying Birds in the second quarter of the year. The second single, 'The Wrestler', was released on 14 May. Upon release, the album debuted at number 16 on the UK Albums Chart, three places higher than the band's second album, while the third single "Out of the Shadows" was released in August.

== Recording ==
In the summer of 2011, the band released a track via YouTube called "Riot" in a response to the riots across England. After recruiting new members such as ex-Milburn frontman Joe Carnall, McClure released news of a slot supporting Noel Gallagher in March 2012. The band released the lead single "Bassline" via Facebook in February of that year after playing their first gigs in two years just days before in Coventry.

== Title ==
The album's title is @Reverend_Makers because McClure could not think of anything which summed up modern times better than the '@' symbol. The album name is the first music record to take its name from a micro-blogging site. McClure stated that the band originally wanted to call the album Out of the Shadows, but joked that it sounded too much like Alan Partridge's Bouncing Back. The band also debated calling the record Pure Bangers, but McClure decided it sounded like an Ibiza club mix.

== Reception ==
@Reverend Makers was met with "mixed or average" reviews from critics. At Metacritic, which assigns a weighted average rating out of 100 to reviews from mainstream publications, this release received an average score of 55 based on 9 reviews.

Allmusic summarised the album as "a pure carefree party record [that] achieves its intentions far more convincingly than the band's previous party political broadcasts." NME called the album "a riot" and gave it 6/10. The Independent gave the record 4/5 commenting that McClure comes across as a "less messed up Shaun Ryder". MusicOMH, meanwhile, commented the record was only let down by its shortness in length. Drowned in Sound gave the album 1/10, claiming that "many demons are slain at the altar of the Reverend in the course this album – wit, eloquence, incisiveness and originality to name but a few," while Q Magazine gave the album one star, advising readers to "steer clear" of the album.

== Track listing ==
@Reverend_Makers track listing
No.	Title	Length
1.	"Bassline"	3:10
2.	"Out of the Shadows"	3:17
3.	"Shine the Light"	3:25
4.	"Depth Charge"	3:33
5.	"Warts n All"	3:04
6.	"Yes You Do"	2:29
7.	"The Wrestler"	2:55
8.	"1+0"	3:24
9.	"Noisy Neighbour"	2:09
10.	"What Goes Around"	3:12

Deluxe edition bonus disc
No.	Title	Length
1.	"MDMAzing" (featuring Howard Marks)	4:11
2.	"Sister Midnight"	2:41
3.	"Deeper Down" (featuring Matic Mouth)	3:43
4.	"Nothing to Say" (featuring Matic Mouth and Kimmi Kub)	2:31
5.	"Depth Charge" (remix, featuring Kano and Rob Harvey)	3:29
6.	"Wife Her Up" (featuring Matic Mouth)	2:24
7.	"Bassline" (James Welsh remix)	3:15
8.	"The Hidden Persuaders" (featuring Blak Twang and Roots Manuva)	3:59
9.	"Acid House Wife" (featuring Carl Barat and Steve Edwards)	3:59
10.	"Faster Faster" (featuring Richard Hawley)	2:40

== Charts ==
Chart performance for @Reverend_Makers
Chart (2012)	Peak position
Scottish Albums (Official Charts)	25
UK Albums (Official Charts)	16
