= Hicks from the Sticks =

Compilation album
- Released: April 1980
- Genre: New wave
- Length: 52:14
- Label: Rockburgh Records

Future Shock reissue cover (1994)

Hicks from the Sticks is a compilation album released in 1980. The album was the brainchild of music journalist Nigel Burnham who wanted to showcase the best new wave bands in the North of England.

The album was reissued on the Thunderbolt label in 1985 as Future Shock.

== Track listing ==
=== Rockburgh Records LP: ROC 111 ===
Side A
No.	Title	Performer	Length
1.	"Move in Rhythm"	Airkraft	3:00
2.	"Sympathy (Don't Be Taken In)"	Expelaires	3:08
3.	"You're Without Sound"	Clock DVA	3:18
4.	"The Human Factor"	Music for Pleasure	2:06
5.	"Shangri-La"	Nightmares in Wax	3:33
6.	"Head in the Clouds"	Ada Wilson & Keeping Dark	3:20
7.	"Choreography"	Modern Eon	2:40
8.	"Them or Me"	Medium Medium	3:55
Total length:			25:00

Side B
No.	Title	Performer	Length
1.	"True Colours"	Radio 5	2:46
2.	"When Have I Seen You"	They Must Be Russians	3:16
3.	"After-Image"	Section 25	2:58
4.	"Gimmik"	Art Failure	2:26
5.	"I Don't Know"	I'm So Hollow	3:54
6.	"Hey Disco Joe"	Wah! Heat	4:54
7.	"Immortal in Mirrors"	Stranger Than Fiction	3:15
8.	"T.V. ME"	The Distributors	3:45
Total length:			27:14

== Credits ==
- Conceived, compiled and compilation produced by Nigel Burnham
- Mastered by Mike Brown
