= The Dylans =

English alternative rock band

- The Dylans, 1994

Background information
- Origin: Sheffield, England
- Genres: Indie pop, alternative rock, baggy, neo-psychedelia
- Years active: 1991–1994
- Labels: Situation Two, Beggars Banquet, RCA, Atlantic
- Past members: Colin Gregory; Jim Rodger; Andy Curtis; Quentin Jennings; Garry Jones; Andy Cook; Craig Scott; Ike Glover

The Dylans were an alternative rock band formed in Sheffield, England, in 1991. The band released two albums before splitting in 1994.

== History ==
The band was formed in early 1990 by former 1,000 Violins guitarist, songwriter, and occasional singer Colin Gregory, now on bass guitar, Jim Rodger (guitar), and Andy Curtis (guitar). They soon recruited Quentin Jennings (keyboards) and Garry Jones (drums), continuing 1,000 Violins sixties-tinged retro style, but with a nod to the "baggy" scene of the time. The band were signed to Beggars Banquet Records' "indie" subsidiary Situation Two (RCA Records in the United States), who released their debut single, "Godlike" in January 1991, which reached the top 10 of the UK Indie Chart. They subsequently replaced Curtis with Andy Cook, and released follow-up singles "Lemon Afternoon" and "Planet Love", before the band's Stephen Street-produced self-titled debut album was released in October 1991. After extensive touring, the band returned in 1992 with the "Mary Quant in Blue" single, but further line-up changes ensued, with Jones and Jennings leaving, to be replaced by Craig Scott and Ike Glover. With interest in the band growing in the United States, the band was signed to Atlantic Records, moving to the main Beggars Banquet roster in the UK for subsequent releases. Two further singles were followed by the band's swansong album, Spirit Finger on 18 April 1993. In the face of disappointing sales, the band split later that year.

== Discography ==
=== Albums ===
- The Dylans (1991) Situation Two/Beggars Banquet (US)
- Spirit Finger (1994) Beggars Banquet/Atlantic

=== Singles ===
- "Godlike" (1991), RCA - UK No. 98, UK Indie No. 5
- "Lemon Afternoon" (1991), Situation Two
- "Planet Love" (1991), Situation Two
- "Mary Quant in Blue" (1992), Situation Two - UK No.82 (16/5/92)
- "Grudge" (1993), Beggars Banquet
- "I'll Be Back to Haunt You" (1994), Beggars Banquet
