= One Thousand Violins =

English indie-pop band

- Origin: Sheffield, England
- Genres: Indie pop, alternative rock
- Years active: 1985–1989
- Labels: Dreamworld, Immaculate, Report, Vinyl Japan
- Past members: Colin Gregory; Darren Swindells; John Wood; David Walmsley; Peter Day; Ian Addey; Vince Keenan

One Thousand Violins were an English 1960s-influenced indie-pop group from Sheffield, Yorkshire, England, who had several UK Indie Chart hits in the late 1980s.

== History ==
The band was formed in 1985 by Darren Swindells (bass), Colin Gregory (guitar), John Wood (vocals), David Walmsley (keyboards/guitar), and Peter Day (drums). Gregory and Walmsley had previously played together in The Page Boys. Their first single, "Halcyon Days" was released in 1985. The B-side, "Like One Thousand Violins" was voted into that year's Festive 50 by listeners to John Peel's BBC Radio 1 show, the band having recorded a session for the show earlier that year. 1986 saw a second Peel session, and the band breaking into the indie chart with "Please Don't Sandblast My House", which reached number 11. In 1987, Day was replaced by Ian Addey, and the indie hits continued with "Ungrateful Bastard", "Locked Out of The Love-In", and "If I Were a Bullet". The following year the band's debut album, Hey Man That's Beautiful was released, and Wood departed, to be replaced by ex-Hays Office singer Vince Keenan. With the band troubled by financial problems and 'mind differences', they split in 1989.

Colin Gregory went on to form The Dylans. Keenan went on to join Splendid Fellows and later SPIGGOTT. Walmsley died from cancer in 1992. Following his departure, original vocalist John Wood formed The Chrysalids with Yves Altana and a retrospective was released in 2012 entitled Neither Love Nor Money.

While the band's success during their lifetime was limited, the internet and the interest in this era of indie pop saw interest in the band increase. Vinyl Japan issued a collection of the band's work in 2000, Like One Thousand Violins. A new compilation, Halcyon Days - Complete Recordings 1985–1987, covering the years with John Wood on vocals and featuring rare tracks, was released by Cherry Red Records on 26 May 2014.

== Discography ==
Chart placings shown are from the UK Indie Chart.

=== Singles ===
- "Halcyon Days" (1985), Dreamworld DREAM 002 12"
- "Please Don't Sandblast My House" (1986), Dreamworld DREAM 008/008T 7"/12" (#11)
- "Ungrateful Bastard" (1987), Constrictor Single-Coll. 001 7" (#27)
- "Locked Out of the Love-In" (1987), Dreamworld DREAM 014/014T 7"/12" (#13)
- "If I Were a Bullet (Then For Sure I'd Find a Way To Your Heart)" (1987), Report REPX1/REPX1T 7"/12" (#17)
- "All Aboard The Lovemobile" (1988), Immaculate IMMAC 7/12 IMMAC 7 7"/12"
- "If Only Words (Would Let Me Conquer You)" (1989), Immaculate IMMAC 9/12 IMMAC 9 7"/12"

=== Albums and EPs ===
- Please Don't Sandblast My House (six track mini-LP) (1987), Constrictor CON! 00008
- Locked Out of the Love-In (1987), Constrictor CON! 00023
- Hey Man That's Beautiful (1988), Immaculate IMMACLP1

Compilations

- Like One Thousand Violins CD (2000), Vinyl Japan ASKLP119/ASKCD119
- Halcyon Days - Complete Recordings 1985-1987 CD (2014), Cherry Red CDMRED624
- John Peel session 25.09.85 10" (2023), Precious Recordings of London PRE027
- John Peel session 02.12.86 10" (2023), Precious Recordings of London PRE028
