= Future Shock (play) =

Future Shock is a science fiction play by Richard Stockwell. It was first performed in Manchester in 2011, and in Salford in 2012. Future Shock won the 2011 Best One-Act Play Award by the Drama Association of Wales.
