= Heavyweight Champion of the World (song) =

2007 single by Reverend and the Makers

Single by Reverend and the Makers

from the album The State of Things
- B-side: "18-30"; "The Last Resort"
- Released: 28 May 2007
- Length: 3:30
- Label: PIAS; Wall of Sound
- Songwriters: Alan Smyth; Jon McClure; Ed Cosens
- Producer: Jagz Kooner

Reverend and the Makers singles chronology
"Heavyweight Champion of the World" (2007)	"He Said He Loved Me" (2007)

"Heavyweight Champion of the World" is the debut single of English band Reverend and the Makers as well as the first single from their debut album, The State of Things (2007). The single was released on 6 May 2007 on download only and was subsequently released on CD and 7-inch vinyl on 28 May that year. The single was also released on a white label that was limited to 800 copies; the track list for this release is the same as the standard vinyl. The song peaked at number eight on the UK Singles Chart and number 85 on the Australian ARIA Singles Chart. It was certified gold by the British Phonographic Industry (BPI) in 2022 for sales and streams exceeding 400,000 units.

== Inspiration ==
"Heavyweight Champion of the World" tells a story of not just under-achievers, but the majority who are trapped within repetitive lives, with the ironic hook "just be like everybody else". Many songs by the band centre on the downward spiral of somebody's life. The song title is taken from a line of Barry Hines's book A Kestrel for a Knave. Like the song, the book's main character is an under-achieving young boy growing up in Yorkshire. The song has received rave reviews, and appeared as Zane Lowe's 'Hottest Record In The World Today', and is equally liked by Radio 1 DJs Nick Grimshaw and Greg James. The single is accredited to Jon McClure, Ed Cosens and Alan Smyth, acknowledging the work that Smyth did towards the demo of the song.

In addition to the reference to Barry Hines, the song's chorus includes another pugilistic reference, from the movie On the Waterfront. The line, "I coulda been a contender. I coulda been somebody" spoken by Marlon Brando in the movie is closely paraphrased in the song's lyrics as "I could've been a contender/Could've been a someone."

== Track listings ==
UK 7-inch single

A1. "Heavyweight Champion of the World"
B1. "18-30"
B2. "The Last Resort" (with John Cooper Clarke)

UK CD single

1. "Heavyweight Champion of the World"
2. "18-30" (extended)
3. "Heavyweight Champion of the World" (club mix)

Australian maxi-CD single

1. "Heavyweight Champion of the World"
2. "18-30"
3. "Heavyweight Champion of the World" (club)
4. "Heavyweight Champion of the World" (dub)
5. "The Last Resort" (with John Cooper Clarke)

== Charts ==
=== Weekly charts ===
Weekly chart performance for "Heavyweight Champion of the World"
Chart (2007)	Peak position
Australia (ARIA)	85
Australia Dance Singles Chart (ARIA)	14
Scottish Singles Sales (Official Charts)	13
UK Singles (Official Charts)	8
UK Indie (Official Charts)	1

=== Year-end charts ===
Year-end chart performance for "Heavyweight Champion of the World"
Chart (2007)	Position
UK Singles (OCC)	82

== Certifications ==
Certifications for "Heavyweight Champion of the World"
Region	Certification	Certified units/sales
United Kingdom (BPI)	Gold	400,000^{‡}
^{‡} Sales+streaming figures based on certification alone.
