= Stoney (musician) =

British musician, songwriter, and producer

Background information
- Born: Mark Stoney; 24 May 1980 (age 45)
- Origin: Sheffield, England
- Genres: Many genres including but not limited to indie, alternative, rock
- Occupation: Musician
- Instruments: Vocals, keyboards, guitar, Bass guitar, Drums
- Years active: 2001–present
- Labels: Island Records; TooNice (UK); Transistor Records; SonicRoar Records; Terrorbird (US)
- Website: Stoney Website

Stoney (born Mark Stoney 24 May 1980) is a British musician, songwriter, multi-instrumentalist, producer and performer. To date he has released 3 solo albums and six E.P's under his performer name of Stoney. Known for his sharp lyrics and classic melodies, he first came to prominence in the "New Yorkshire" music scene (as the NME would label it) in the mid-2000s touring and working alongside acts such as Arctic Monkeys, Long Blondes and Reverend and the Makers. Following relocation to Austin, Texas in 2009, he became a founding member, songwriter and guitarist of acclaimed "dirt-pop" band Bobby Jealousy, who released two full-length albums between 2012 and 2014, before resuming his solo career back in the UK.

Stoney is also an accomplished producer and co-writer for up and coming talent and has worked with Ivor Novello award-winning Guy Chambers, Rick Rubin, Warren Huart and Tim Palmer. Stoney currently lives and works in Sheffield, England.

== Early career ==
Stoney first appeared on the UK music scene following the release of his debut inventive and homegrown-style album Amber in 2001. A quirky collection of songs written in his teens, and recorded in his Sheffield basement following his escape from his hometown of Croydon, it was independently distributed initially through a few local record shops on his own Holy Moly label. Stoney played all the instruments on the record. In response to the positive public reaction, a full band was formed to take the songs to the stage, and a three track EP of songs from the album, titled Amber EP, was released nationally on Thunderbird Records the next year gaining Stoney his first national radio airplay.

Stoney signed to Island Records in 2003, teaming up with producers Kevin Bacon and Jon Quarmby (Longpigs, Richard Hawley, Sugababes, Finley Quaye) to record an album. During this time, Stoney and his band performed under the name of Stoneylacuna, to reflect the change from the singer-songwriter feel of Amber to the bigger, full band sound of the new recordings. However, political wrangles ensued and Stoney parted company with the label the following year without a record being released.

== The Scene and The Unseen ==
A few months after parting ways with Island Records, the limited edition single "Constantly Running" was released nationally on the small Transistor label, and became the single of the week on the iTunes music store, restarting a frenzy of activity. The single achieved over 17,000 downloads in the UK alone in the first week. Stoney followed up with the Soap in a Bathtub EP, which brought him further national exposure. After forming a new band, Stoney provided the support for the Arctic Monkeys first sell-out UK tour in the Summer of 2005, alongside festival appearances at Glastonbury and Leeds.

Stoney became a regular guest on BBC Radio 2 and BBC 6Music and further shows with high-profile acts such as Jamie T, Athlete and Feeder along with his own headline shows quickly gained him a reputation as an exhilarating and charismatic live performer, continuing to win him a steadily growing underground UK fanbase. A double A-side single featuring fan favourites "Until You Leave" and "Holds the Stars" was released at the end of 2005. Stoney released the 12 track album The Scene and The Unseen in the summer of 2006 on the independent Manchester based label Too Nice Recordings and as a download on iTunes. Despite a typically low-key and organic release, it prompted widespread critical acclaim from the national UK papers, with rave reviews from The Independent, NME, The Sunday Times and The Daily Express. It reached Number 19 in the UK iTunes download chart and peaked at Number 4 in France. The album was re-released with full UK distribution on his own Sonic Roar Label in November 2007. During this period, Stoney also started producing other artists, and set up Lacuna Productions, a record production company with fellow Sheffield producer Sam Jones. Lacuna birthed debut singles from several rising Sheffield indie stars such as Bromheads Jacket and Little Ze.

== Relocation to US ==
Following an acoustic show at the SXSW festival in Texas, he was flown to Los Angeles by Rick Rubin for a private showcase and champions of Stoney on US radio such as Nic Harcourt at KCRW raised Stoney's profile over the Atlantic. His tracks started to feature in several Hollywood films & TV series.

In response Stoney relocated to Austin, Texas in 2009 and began working on new material with a number of producers including C.J Eiriksson (u2, the rocket summer, Blue October), Darin Prindle (Madonna, Destiny's Child) His first public show was a stripped back set at the British Music Embassy showcase at SXSW alongside Laura Marling & Aqualung and presented by Nic Harcourt. In 2010, Stoney was among the earliest artists to implement the fan funding model, teaming up with PledgeMusic, he successfully launched a new 4 track E.P titled "The Soar Before" and an accompanying 16 date U.K tour with Athlete. The fans raised the target in 3 days, and the tour was followed by Stoney's fourth live session and interview on Dermot O'Leary's BBC Radio 2 show, alongside fellow guest Paul McCartney.

== Bobby Jealousy ==
In the summer of 2012, Stoney took a departure from his solo career and co-founded a new band in Austin named "Bobby Jealousy" alongside local punk singer Sabrina Ellis and producer Seth Gibbs. The trio of songwriters adopted the services of drummer Clint Simmons and quickly established a strong following in Austin with a series of raucous live residencies around the City. Their debut album "A little Death" was recorded at Gibb's Superpop Studio in the space of a few weeks and was met with critical acclaim, with the lead single "Rainbow" being adopted as the theme tune for Comedy Central's "Big Time in Hollywood, FL" TV Show. The band released a follow-up album "The Importance of being Jealous", appeared at the Austin City Limits Music Festival and conducted two tours of the United States before parting ways in 2014.

== More Than Animals ==
Following the break up of Bobby Jealousy, Stoney resumed work on a Solo album and in 2014 released his third full album More Than Animals once again to critical acclaim. Largely self produced, several tracks from the album were mixed in Los Angeles with Producer Warren Huart. The release was again fan-funded through Pledgemusic, and met with very favorable reviews internationally. A video for the album track "We Belonged" was shot in the Hill Country in Texas to accompany the album release and the track has since been used in the Series finale of popular us TV show Hart of Dixie and the feature film "The Funeral Guest". The album track "Devil on My Back" was used in the first series finale of Legends starring Sean Bean.

== Current work ==
After moving back to the UK in 2015, Stoney began working extensively as a producer and co-writer, helping to develop and support emerging talent across multiple genres, as well as collaborations with established artists such as The Big Pink and Jade Castrinos (of Edward Sharpe and the Magnetic Zeros)

In early 2020, Stoney announced on social media the forthcoming release of new solo material later in the year.

== Discography ==
As Stoney:

- Constantly Running. CD & iTunes single. January, 2005. Transistor Records.
- Soap in a Bathtub. CD, 7" and iTunes single. June, 2005. Transistor Records.
- Until You Leave/Holds The Stars. Double A-side CD, 7" and iTunes single. November, 2005. Too Nice Records.
- The Scene and the Unseen. CD Album. 2006. Too Nice Records.
- Holds The Stars. iTunes Single of the week. November 2006
- Jailbird CD Single November 2007 - Sonic Roar / Transistor
- The Scene & The Unseen CD Album (re-release) Nov 2007 Sonic Roar/Transistor
- The Soar before CD E.P Nov 2010 Sonic Roar Records
- "More Than Animals" 2014 CD Album, Download

As Mark Stoney:

- Amber. CD Album. 2001. Holy Moly Records.
- Amber EP. CD EP. 2002. Thunderbird Records.

As Stoneylacuna:

- Constantly Running. CD single. 2004. Transistor Records.

As Bobby Jealousy:

- "A Little Death" CD Album. Feb 2012 Superpop Records

Compilations:

- The Saturday Sessions: The Dermot O'Leary Show (2007, Virgin/EMI) - "Waterfall"
- KCRW's The Next One (2008) - Until You Leave
- SXSW 2009 "Sounds of Yorkshire - "Skyline"

Production, songwriting and guest appearances:

- The Big Pink Co-writer, Various 2020
- Franz Von, Various 2020, Producer, Guest vocals
- "Cortney Dixon" "Kingpin" 2016 songwriter, arranger, all instrumentation, Producer,
- "Cortney Dixon" "Summer's Eyes" 2016, 2019 songwriter, arranger, Original Production
- "Cortney Dixon" "Anywhere's Home" 2016 songwriter, arranger, all instrumentation, Producer
- "Cortney Dixon" "What you wanna do" 2019 songwriter, arranger, original production
- "Cortney Dixon" "Parliament of Owls" 2020 songwriter, arranger, original production
- "Annie Lennox" "Bittersweet" Lyricist
- Nolween Leroy "Lights are on" Lyricist
- Border Scout "Hold your fire" & "Let's Pretend we're Dead" Guest Vocalist
- Kym Brown "I got the stuff" Arranged/Remixed
- Jonnie Horden, "All's not lost", Producer
- Midnights Silent Repose: Producer/ Co-writer
- Neil McSweeney - Guest vocals on "Standing Still" from the album "Shoreline"
- Quiet Company - Guest backing vocals on album "We Are All Where We Belong"

== Film and television ==
- The Moguls (2006 - Jeff Bridges, Ted Danson, US) features Stoney's track Underdog
- Fireflies in the Garden (2008 - Julia Roberts, Willem Dafoe, US) features Stoney's track Best laid plans
- BBC EastEnders episode June 2006 Featured Stoney's Track Until you leave
- D.I.R.T (Touchstone, US) Season 1, Episode 7 features Stoney's track Best Laid Plans
- Heroes & Villains (2007 - Vertigo films, UK) Features Stoney track Holds The Stars
- Dirty Sanchez (2008, MTV) Features various Stoney tracks
- Hades Bridge - (2008, UK VHK films - in production)Trailer features Stoney Track Round Here
- Current TV documentary on Stoney - 2008 Sheffield Rock Star (Current TV, UK/US)
- My Dangerous Loverboy (2009-Vita Nova films UK) Features Stoney-produced Set me Free
- American Idol Season 10, week 5, Features Stoney track "Ghost"
- Falling Overnight (DPO productions, 2011) Features Stoney track "Until you leave"
- Chuck and Ted's Outback Adventure, (A-List entertainment, 2013 ) Original Score by Stoney
- Legends Starring Sean Bean (TNT productions, 2014) Season Finale Features Stoney track "Devil on my Back"
- Big Time in Hollywood, FL (Comedy Central, 2015) Features "Rainbow" as theme tune, co-written by Stoney & Bobby Jealousy
- Hart of Dixie (The CW, 2015) Series 10 finale Features Stoney track "We Belonged"
- The Funeral Guest (Aphtic Productions, 2015) Feature Film Features Stoney track "We Belonged"
- Buster's Mal Heart (Well Go USA, 2017) Feature film opens with a cover of Tom Waits "Starving in the Belly of a Whale", on which Stoney performed.
- Her Majesty's Spiffing Computer game, 2017 features Stoney & Guy Chambers track "The Fall" as closing credits
- The Row (Emmett/Furla/Oasis films, 2018) Feature Film features Stoney tracks "Glory Days, Constantly Running, and "Now's a Good Time"
- Interrogation (TV series)(CBS All- Access, 2020) Episode 6 features Stoney track "Ghost"
