= Harrisons (band) =

English indie rock band

- Origin: Sheffield, England
- Genre: Indie rock
- Years active: 2003–2008
- Label: Melodic Records
- Members: Jubby Taylor; Mark White; Ben Stanton; Ashley Birch

Harrisons were a four-piece guitar band from Hillsborough in Sheffield, England. They were one of the leading bands in the so-called New Yorkshire scene, along with fellow Sheffielders Arctic Monkeys, Milburn, The Long Blondes and Bromheads Jacket. Harrisons were: Jubby Taylor (vocals and guitar), Ben Stanton (guitar), Ashley Birch (bass), and Mark White (drums).

== History ==
In 2005, the band recorded a live session for Phill Jupitus' show on BBC 6Music, and played the South By Southwest festival in Texas. They have also featured many times in NME, including a feature where the band guided a journalist around their favourite Sheffield haunts, including Sheffield Wednesday Football Club. The band signed a deal with Melodic Records in 2006, and released their debut album No Fighting in the War Room in January 2008. The video to the band's "Blue Note" single was based on the film Kes, and starred Phoenix Nights star Steve Edge as a Brian Glover-style PE teacher.

Harrisons split one week before the album was released. Not wanting to give up music, they quickly formed two new bands – Park Brigade (Jubby) and The Flying Squad (Ben, Birchy, and Mark). Park Brigade split in early 2009. Jubby is currently doing solo work with his band The Absinthe Tears, and Mark rejoins him on stage – this time behind a piano. In March 2010, The Flying Squad changed their name to Black Flowers and Mark played his final show in December of the same year.

Their debut 12 track album "No Fighting in the War Room" was initially due to be released on 18 June 2007 but was then put back to January 2008. On 14 November 2009, Mark White posted a history of Harrisons in his blog.

== Discography ==
- "Wishing Well" / "Out Tonight" (7"/CD, 2005)
- "Blue Note" / "Shirley's Temple" (7"/CD released 13 February 2006)
- "Monday's Arms APB* Remix" (12" released 18 September 2006)
- "Monday's Arms" / "Loxley Bottoms" (7"/CD released 26 February 2007) – CD also includes: "Monday's Arms (APB Remix)"
- "Dear Constable" (2x7"/CD released 18 June 2007)
  - b-sides include:
    "Red Right Hand" (Nick Cave cover) (7")
    "Cry Through the Night" (7")
    "Allen Ginsburg Says James Dean's A Twocker" (CD)
