= Alan Smyth =

English record producer

Alan Smyth is an English record producer from Sheffield, England. He has worked with a number of bands, including Pulp, Arctic Monkeys, Reverend and The Makers, The Long Blondes, Milburn, Richard Hawley, The Fever Club, The Scaramanga Six, Smokers Die Younger, Monkey Swallows the Universe, The Lodger, Little Man Tate, 65daysofstatic, Little Lost David, Albany, Dead Like Harry, RedFaces, Oddity Road, The Silverfish, The Magi, Dead World Leaders, Little Ze, Jack's Attic, Smiling Ivy, Pink Sharabang and The Hurriers. He works from his own studio in the city, 2fly Studios.

Between 1986 and 1992, he was part of the Indie C&W outfit, Don Valley & The Rotherhides (in which all the members were named after areas of Sheffield), whose songs included "Thatcher's Dead". He also played guitar and performed backing vocals in the 1990s Sheffield guitar band Seafruit. Seafruit's single "Looking For Sparks" was used for a while on Sky Sports' football coverage.
