= Monkey Swallows the Universe =

English acoustic/indie band

- Origin: Sheffield, England
- Genre: Indie folk
- Years active: 2004–2008
- Labels: Thee Sheffield Phonographic Corporation, Loose
- Past members: Nat Johnson; Kevin Gori; Catherine Tully; Andy George; Rob Dean

Monkey Swallows the Universe (MSTU) were an acoustic/indie band from Sheffield, England. Their sound has been described as "folk tinged" and "twee, " and their name comes from an episode of the Japanese TV series Monkey. MSTU were active from 2004 to 2008.

== History ==
Nat Johnson and Kevin Gori established MSTU in 2003 after meeting at the University of Sheffield. In the band's first incarnation, they both sang and played acoustic guitars, with Gori adding extra touches with instruments such as the recorder and glockenspiel. The band later expanded to include Catherine Tully on violin, Andy George on cello, and Rob Dean on drums, while Johnson became the main singer and songwriter. In February 2006, the band released its first album, The Bright Carvings, on the small independent record label Thee Sheffield Phonographic Corporation. The band has been featured a number of times in Sandman magazine.

On April 11, 2006 the band appeared on Gideon Coe's BBC 6 Music morning radio show and played two songs, and in May 2006, the band supported Richard Hawley on three dates of his UK tour. Later that year, the band supported The Long Blondes on five dates of their UK tour. In July 2006, MSTU released "Science" as a CD single, and on 7" vinyl, also on Thee SPC record label.

In August 2007, the band signed to Loose Records to release a second album, The Casket Letters. The band also released a single from the album, "Little Polveir", titled after a racehorse of the same name who was an unlikely winner of the 1989 British Grand National. The band performed further live radio sessions, including an appearance on Radio 4's Loose Ends. The band appeared at several festivals in the UK, including Latitude, Green Man, Truck, Secret Garden Party and End of the Road. A download-only single, "Bloodline", was released in September 2007, backed with a cover of Jonathan Richman's "Ice Cream Man". The band also performed these songs live on Marc Riley's 6 Music show.

On December 4, 2007, the band announced via its official website that it would be taking an indefinite hiatus after touring. MSTU played their last show in Edinburgh on February 11, 2008. After the announcement of hiatus, Nat Johnson began a solo career, and released the single "Dirty Rotten Soul" in 2008. In 2009, she and Kevin Gori formed Nat Johnson and the Figureheads, who released albums on Damaged Goods Records and Thee Sheffield Phonographic Corporation.

Nat Johnson appeared on David Rotheray's album, The Life of Birds, on the track "Flying Lessons, " as well as on the album Another Sleepless Night with Rory McVicar by Rory McVicar. She released solo singles "DOG" in May 2014, followed by "Not Now Horse" in September 2014. Her seven-song album, Neighbour of the Year, came out in November 2014.

MTSU reformed for a one-off gig at Queens Social Club in Sheffield in March 2016 to mark the 10th anniversary of the release of The Bright Carvings.

== Discography and Track Listing ==
=== The Bright Carvings (2006) ===
1. Sheffield Shanty
2. Martin
3. Jimmy Down the Well
4. The Chicken Fat Waltz
5. Down
6. You Yesterday
7. Wallow
8. 22
9. Fonz You!
10. Still
11. Beautiful Never
12. Secret Word Is Groucho (hidden track)

=== The Casket Letters (2007) ===
1. Statutory Rights
2. Bloodline
3. Science
4. Matterhoney
5. Gravestones
6. Little Polveir
7. Elizabeth & Mary
8. Ballad of the Breakneck Bride
9. Paper, Scissors, Stone
10. When the Work Is Done

== Critical acclaim ==
- "Delightful indiepop" – Daily Telegraph
- "Roll over Charles Darwin and tell those musical evolutionists the news – there's yet more Sheffield Monkeys beside the Arctic variety." – The Mirror
