= Reverend and the Makers =

English rock band

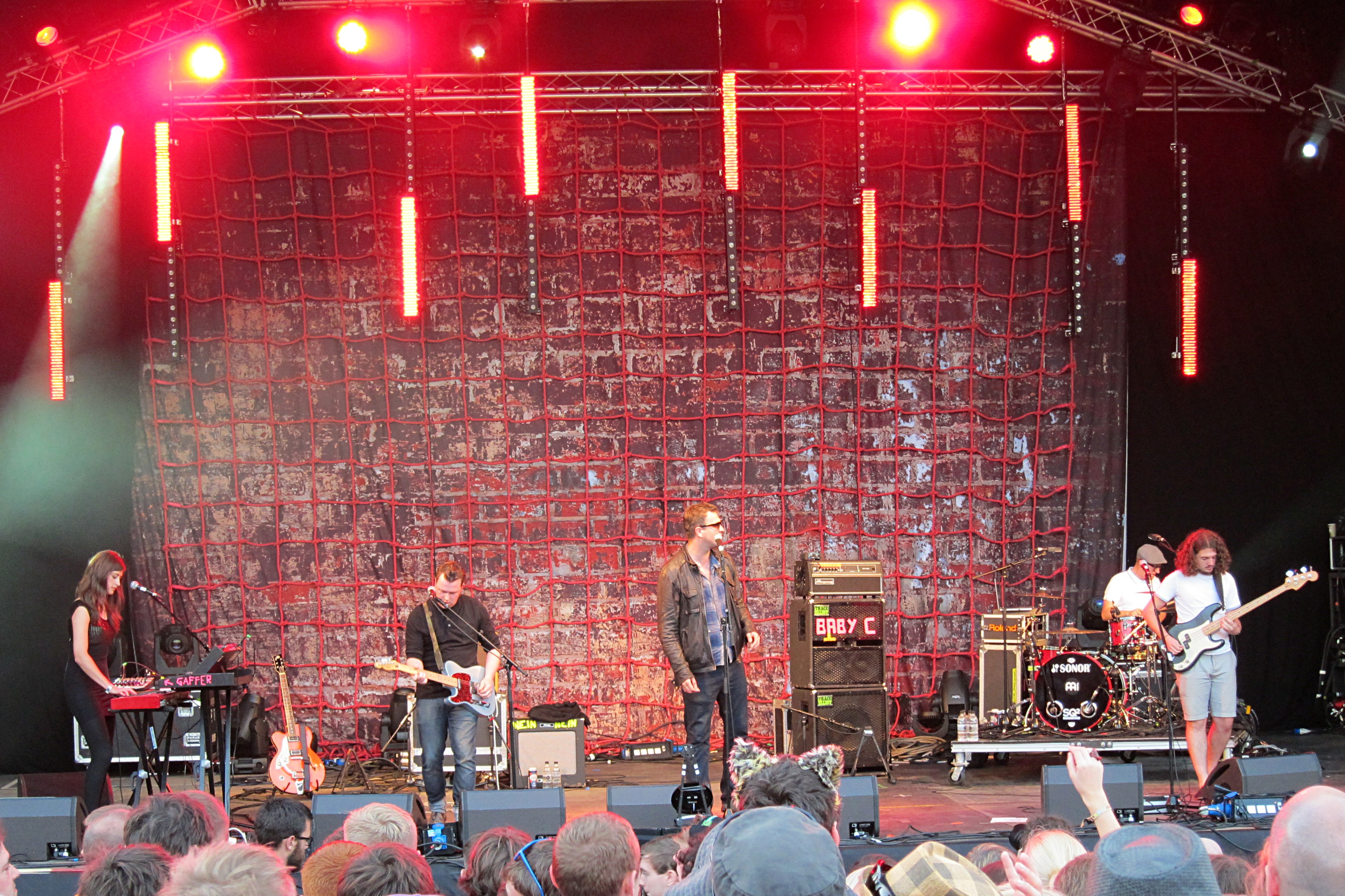
- Reverend and the Makers performing in August 2012

Background information
- Origin: Sheffield, South Yorkshire, England
- Genres: Indie rock; dance-rock; electronica; ska revival
- Years active: 2002–present
- Labels: Cooking Vinyl; Wall of Sound
- Members: Jon McClure; Laura McClure; Antonia Pooles; Tom Dibb; Adam Crofts
- Past members: Ed Cosens; Joe Carnall; Ryan Jenkinson; Joe Moskow; Richy Westley; Dave Sanderson; Tom Jarvis; Tom Rowley; Andy Nicholson; Stuart Doughty; Paul Blakeman
- Website: www.reverendandthemakers.co.uk

Reverend and the Makers are an English rock band from Sheffield, South Yorkshire. The band is fronted by Jon McClure, nicknamed "The Reverend". Their debut album, The State of Things (2007), helped them gain success in Britain and spawned the UK top 10 single "Heavyweight Champion of the World". The band released their second album, A French Kiss in the Chaos (2009), which led to them being invited to support Oasis on their final tour, of the first part of their career, playing venues such as Wembley Stadium. The band's third studio album, @Reverend_Makers, was released in 2012, their fourth studio album, ThirtyTwo, was released in 2014 which had more electronic and dance music influences. These were followed by Mirrors in 2015 and The Death of a King in 2017 which showcased a hard rock and folk influenced sound. Their seventh album, the soul and R&B inflected Heatwave in the Cold North was released in 2023 and became the band's first Top 10 album in the UK in 16 years. On 15 November 2024, the band made a bid to be the Christmas number 1 with a single, "Late Night Phone Call", raising awareness of the Samaritans and the support they provide.

== History ==
=== 2002–2006: Early years ===
In late 2002, McClure brought several musicians together for Reverend and the Makers. Like his previous bands, the Makers included co-songwriter Ed Cosens, this time playing bass. The rest of The Makers consisted of Dave Sanderson (guitars), Joe Moskow (keyboards), Richy Westley (drums, formerly of Hoggboy) and Laura Manuel (vocals), and occasionally Simon Strafford on trombone. Sanderson was dismissed in July 2006 after the band completed their first headline UK tour and replaced by Gledhill guitarist Tom Jarvis.

Late in 2005, fellow Sheffield band Arctic Monkeys released their debut single, and McClure was hounded by major record labels, reportedly offering him sums of up to £150,000 to make an album like Arctic Monkeys. McClure declined the offer, and decided to do everything his own way, managing to sell out The Plug in Sheffield twice, a venue with a capacity of 1,000 people, while still unsigned. It was not until the following year that McClure met Mark Jones in a club in London when he asked him for a lighter. The two got talking and Mark Jones came to see Reverend and the Makers at the next show. Jones reportedly proclaimed the band as the "best band in the world" and signed them to his label Wall of Sound Records.

Reverend and The Makers released a 9-track demo in 2006, entitled "Ten Songs". The artwork included a track list with ten songs, track 10 being "Paris at Night". However this song was not made available for download; it only surfaced on the internet in August 2007. The demos were recorded at 2Fly Studios, and produced by Alan Smyth, McClure acknowledges the work Smyth put into the demos by accrediting the debut single; "Heavyweight Champion of The World" as McClure/Cosens/Smyth. Reverend and the Makers' music is a mix of indie guitar pop, electronica and a touch of Madchester-esque funk. Some of the internet demos feature members of other notable Sheffield musicians such as Alex Turner (Arctic Monkeys), Tim Hampton (Bromheads Jacket) and Mike Hughes (Little Ze). One of Reverend's inspirations is Manchester performance poet John Cooper Clarke and Reverend often performs his own poems, of a similar style, in between songs during his live sets. One of the B-sides to the debut single "Heavyweight Champion of the World" is a poem entitled "Last Resort" in which John Cooper Clarke and McClure read alternate stanzas. This poem was also duetted live when the band played live at Shoreditch's Spread Eagle in the first tour in May 2006.

In April 2006, Reverend and The Makers were support to the Arctic Monkeys on their sold out UK tour, exposing the band to larger audiences and bigger venues. This was followed by their own first UK tour in May and June, selling out dates in Shoreditch, London and The Plug in home-town Sheffield on the final night. A second tour followed in October 2006, showing great progression as a band.

=== 2007–2009: The State of Things and breakthrough ===
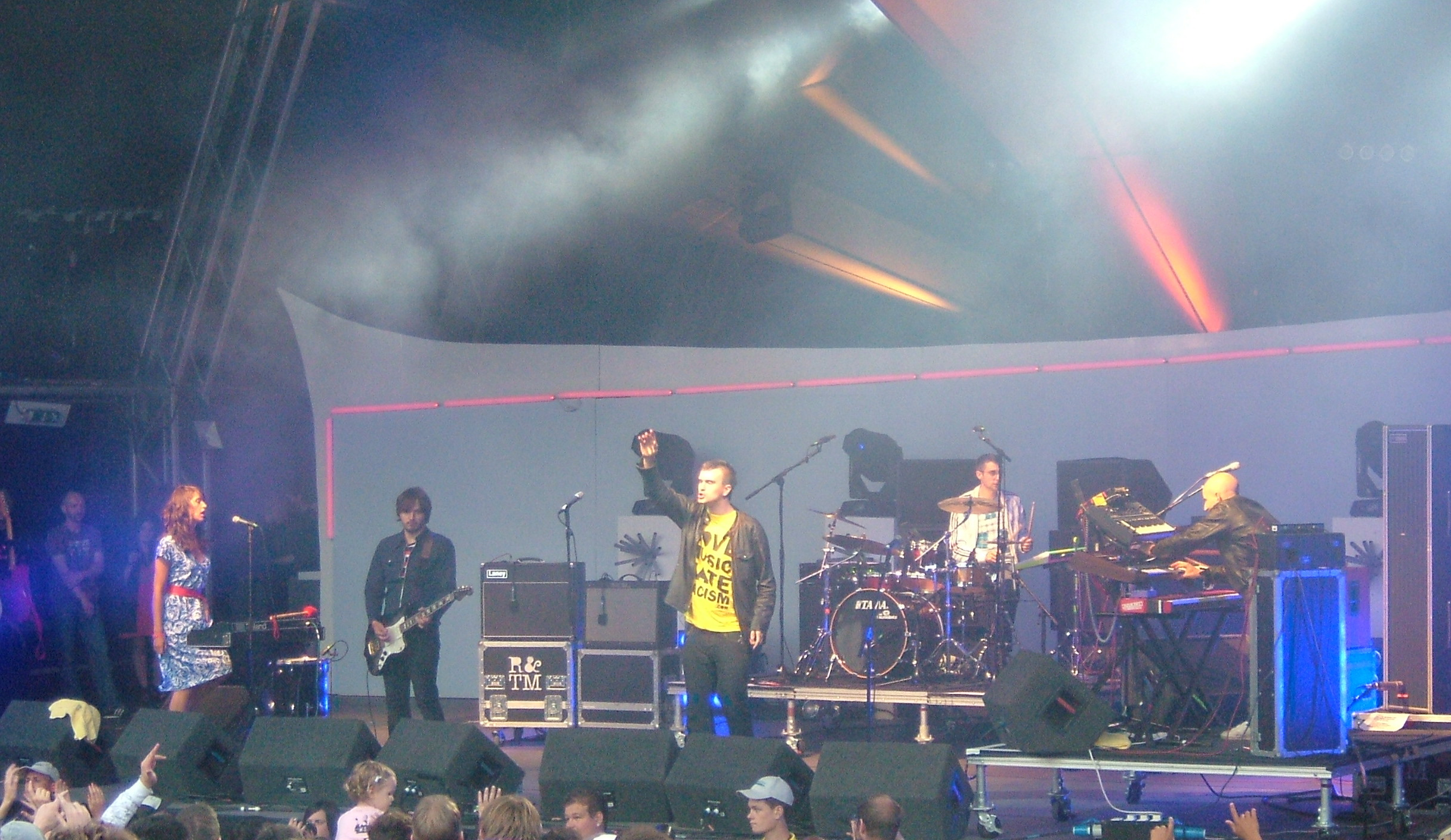
Performing at Summer Sundae in 2008

In 2008, Reverend and The Makers set a date for their first release and undertook a UK tour, including several festivals over the summer period including Glastonbury Festival, Carling Weekend, T in the Park, Oxegen and T4 on the Beach as well as supporting the Red Hot Chili Peppers at Hampden Park, Glasgow. In January 2008, Reverend and The Makers toured Australia.

Their first release was "Heavyweight Champion of the World" on 28 May 2007 and featured the B-Sides "18–30" and "The Last Resort" featuring John Cooper Clarke. The single takes its name from a line in A Kestrel for a Knave a novel by Barry Hines and a favourite book of McClure. The single is available on both CD and 7" vinyl formats, including a limited edition "White Vinyl" release. The single was released for download on 6 May and reached No. 38 in the UK single chart on download only. The album, entitled The State of Things, was recorded over the Christmas period and was released on Wall of Sound on 17 September 2007. The album features songs co-written and performed with Alex Turner of Arctic Monkeys and one track co-written and with guest vocals from Tim Hampton of Bromheads Jacket, other tracks include vocals by Steve Edwards.

In June 2008, drummer Richy Westley left the group to form his own band Strange and Partners. In August 2008 frontman Jon McClure said he would quit music after their next album, although a month later he changed his mind. The inconsistency of McClure's actions has led many critics in the music press to report negatively towards the move. Welsh band Future of the Left joked of their delight at the band's split at live shows on their tour at the time, as can be heard on their live album Last Night I Saved Her from Vampires. Around this time McClure had a side project, Mongrel, with a single "Hit from the Morning Sun" released in February 2009.

Early 2009, it was announced that Tom Jarvis had left the band, and had been replaced by Tom Rowley (ex-Milburn), Rowley was already a good friend of McClure, and contributed to the first album by co-writing the tracks "Bandits" and "Miss Brown".

The band supported Oasis, along with Kasabian and The Enemy for their sold out summer tour in 2009. The band released their follow up to 2007's The State of Things, with A French Kiss in the Chaos. The album was released in June and the opening single, "Silence Is Talking" was featured during the band's three night run at Wembley Stadium. The band released a second single, "No Soap (in a Dirty War)" in October.

McClure was in the media spotlight for his personal views in July 2009, after an interview in which he commented on Jade Goody's death earlier in the year; "it's sad she died and it's good more girls are getting smear tests but let's not forget she was a talentless racist". He had also been speaking out about the UK's involvement in the Iraq War, requesting that fellow musicians, particularly Arctic Monkeys, his contemporaries from Sheffield, focus on real issues and to "not write songs about girls at bus stops any more like me and Monkeys used to do, let's start talking about what's happening man as otherwise you know where we gonna go, we're going down the toilet aren't we?".

In December 2009, it was announced via McClure's Twitter that Andy Nicholson, his fellow member in Mongrel and ex-Arctic Monkeys bassist would join the band for their third album. NME published the story on its website soon after.

=== 2010–2014: Hiatus, @Reverend_Makers and ThirtyTwo ===
McClure announced via his Twitter in July 2011 that "the recording of the Reverend and The Makers third album is underway". In August 2011, the band posted a new track called "Riot" on their YouTube page, in response to the 2011 England riots. It was announced in January 2012 that the band had completed work for the third album, scheduled for a release later that year. The band also revealed that they would be supporting Noel Gallagher's High Flying Birds on their UK Arena tour in spring. The album was produced by Jason Cox and James Dring (Gorillaz) and Youth (The Verve, U2) and moved away from the political-minded nature of the band's second album. The band also announced they had signed to Cooking Vinyl Records. McClure also stated that ex-Milburn and current The Book Club frontman Joe Carnall was to join the band, as well as ex-thisGirl drummer Ryan Jenkinson.

In February 2012, the band played their first gig for two years in Coventry. Just days after, they released their lead single off their third album, Bassline, via their Facebook page. The band also announced their third album would be entitled @Reverend Makers due to "nothing representing the modern times more than the '@' symbol", according to McClure. The album was released on 18 June. The band appeared on Soccer AM in May 2012 and stated the next released single would be "The Wrestler" (which was released on 14 May 2012). The album was released on 18 June 2012 and reached number 16 on the UK Albums Chart. In December 2012 the band released a live CD & DVD titled "Reverend and The Makers Live In Sheffield", recorded at O2 Academy Sheffield in October 2012.

The band announced in October 2013 that their fourth record would be released in February 2014 and produced by Youth, James Welsh and the band. The album was titled ThirtyTwo after Jon McClure's age and was the second album on the Cooking Vinyl record Label. In the buildup to the album Jon Mclure travelled the country playing acoustic gigs in fans living rooms which they won through Twitter. On this tour, which Jon titled '32 House Gigs' there was a wedding proposal, a dog named after him and much television and press interest. The 32nd gig was held in Sheffield's Winter Gardens. The album debuted at number 5 in the midweek chart before ending the week at number 13 becoming Reverend and the Makers fourth top 20 album in a row. The release coincided with a UK tour in support of the album.

=== 2015–2022: Mirrors and The Death of a King ===
On 9 October 2015 the band released their fifth studio album, their third on the Cooking Vinyl record label.

The band released their sixth album on 22 September 2017, which debuted at Number 11 on the UK Albums Chart, their best performing album since their 2007 debut.

=== 2023–present: Heatwave in the Cold North and Is This How Happiness Feels? ===
The band released their seventh album, Heatwave in the Cold North, on 28 April 2023, which was preceded by a single of the same name. The album debuted and peaked at number 6 on the UK Albums Chart, and spent two weeks on the UK Albums Sales Chart. A tour had been announced for November 2024, but was cancelled in the September, due to the death of Jon McClure's father.

On 15 November 2024, the band released the single "Late Night Phone Call"; the song was released as a Christmas charity single, with proceeds going to benefit the charity Samaritans. In April 2025, the band performed a one-night-only concert in Melbourne, Australia. On 17 July 2025, the band released the single "Haircut", which features English actress Vicky McClure on co-lead vocals. An official music video, directed by Nick Suchak, was released a day later. The single peaked at number 17 on the UK Singles Downloads Chart. On 18 July 2025, they announced their eighth studio album, Is This How Happiness Feels? would be released on 24 April 2026. On 26 September 2025, they released the single "UFO", followed by "Twenty-Seven Past Midnight" on 30 January 2026.

== Tours ==
On 30 April 2007 Reverend and The Makers performed "Heavyweight Champion Of The World" and a cover of Kelis's "Trick Me" on Radio 1's Live Lounge with Jo Whiley. In October 2007, supported by The Ting Tings, they made a tour of universities in the UK. Former Arctic Monkeys bassist Andy Nicholson made guest appearances to play bass for a couple of songs. On 8 December 2007 they supported Ian Brown on the final leg of his tour, and supported The Verve on 11 and 13 December. They also supported in Dublin on 28 October in the Big Top venue in the Phoenix Park.

On 12 February 2008 they performed on Lily Allen's talk show Lily Allen and Friends. In March 2008 the band released an EP consisting of three remixes of "Sundown On The Empire", three for the track "18–30" and one for "The Machine" for a total of seven tracks. On 26 July 2009, they played in their home city of Sheffield, closing the Tramlines Festival with an 80-minute gig.

In the summer of 2009 they have supported Oasis on the largest stadium tour in the UK and Ireland. On 1 September 2009, they performed a secret free gig at Tate Modern, London. They were introduced by Sara Cox and supported by Stornoway. The gig was to celebrate the launch of new climate change campaign—"10:10". In November 2009, the band supported Kasabian on their nationwide tour. For the past 2 years, the band have played New Year's Eve shows at KOKO in Camden, London.

== Other activities ==
=== WTKA Open Championships (formally European Open Championship) ===
In 2012 Mark Rooker, GB's Operations Director for the World Traditional Karate Association approached McClure for permission to use "Heavyweight Champion Of The World" as the official song for the first ever unified European Open Championship of Martial Art at The Ponds Forge International Sports Center in his hometown of Sheffield, on 18 August. McClure agreed and the WTKA have continued to use the tune ever since

=== Reverend Soundsystem club nights ===
Reverend hosted a monthly club night on the first Saturday of every month named "Reverend Soundsystem" at The Plug in Sheffield, and has also hosted one event at Manchester's Po Na Na. The Soundsystem has featured a number of guest DJs such as Mani (The Stone Roses/Primal Scream), Peter Hook (New Order), the late Tony Wilson (Factory Records), Andy Nicholson (ex-Arctic Monkeys), Chris McClure (face of the Arctic Monkeys debut album cover (Whatever People Say I Am, That's What I'm Not) and brother of Jon), Terry Hall (The Specials), Milburn, Bez and Arctic Monkeys as well as live performances from The Sunshine Underground, Gas Club, Stoney, 747s, The Hosts and White Rose Movement. The event no longer takes place at The Plug.

=== Reverend mixtape ===
At the Leadmill venue in Sheffield on 27 May 2007, approximately 200 CDs entitled And While the World Was Asleep We Were Listening To... were handed out to the fans. It was reported that more copies would be available later in the year in independent record shops. The cover featured a poem by McClure on the back "Just Like His Dad" which is a b-side to the single "He Said He Loved Me". The mixtape features songs from Cymande, Pixeltan, The Clash and Love. The CD opens with an alternative version of "The Last Resort" which only features McClure's verses and has a synth backing.

=== For the fans ===
Jon McClure puts on an acoustic gig in the car park of most venues. These sets normally last between 30 and 45 minutes and this is the type of thing that McClure is becoming synonymous with among his fans. He also invited fans to a "backing singer evening" to help record vocals on an upcoming single. He is heavily involved in the Instigate Debate group, and offers to carry out private gigs in fans homes to anyone who contributes. On 13 May 2009, it was revealed that McClure was going to be one of the curators of the new Tramlines festival in Sheffield along with Matt Helders from Arctic Monkeys and Toddla T.

=== Reverend Soundsystem (RSS) ===
Reverend Soundsystem is a side project made up of Jon (The Reverend) McClure, Marcus 'Matic Mouth' Smith, Laura McClure and Jimmy Welsh (Ocelot).

== Lies ==
Lies is a series of short films based on stories/poems written by Jon McClure. The films are part of the local independent film production Kestrel Filmworks with sponsorship from Boxfresh. Lies is a tongue in cheek look at lies told to Jon and his brother Chris throughout their childhood. In total there are six films.

== Discography ==
Albums

- The State of Things (2007)
- A French Kiss in the Chaos (2009)
- @Reverend_Makers (2012)
- ThirtyTwo (2014)
- Mirrors (2015)
- The Death of a King (2017)
- Heatwave in the Cold North (2023)
- Is This How Happiness Feels? (2026)
