= Artery (band) =

British post-punk band

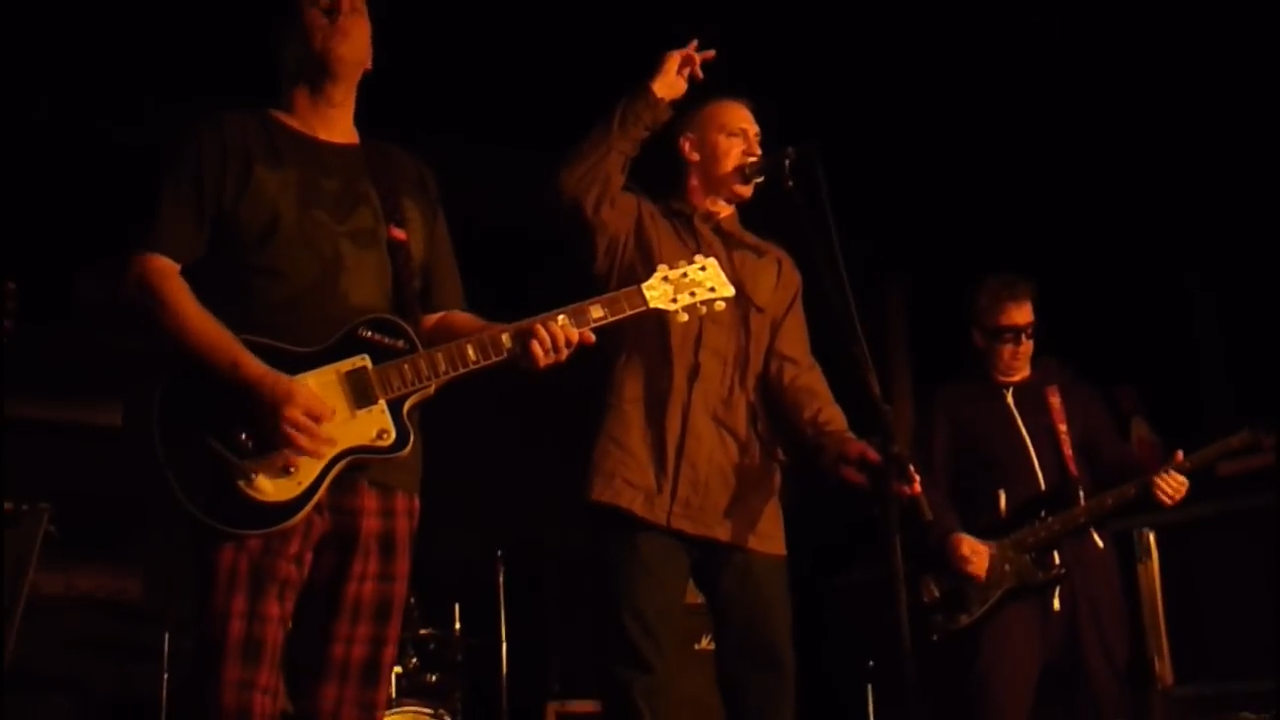
- Artery in 2011

Background information
- Origin: Sheffield, England
- Genres: Post-punk
- Years active: 1978–1985, 2007–present
- Labels: Red Flame, Golden Dawn, Phantom Power
- Members: Mark Gouldthorpe; Garry Wilson; James Bacon; Simon Barfield; Murray Fenton
- Past members: Toyce Ashley; Neil MacKenzie; Mick Fidler; Simon Hinkler; John White; Christopher Hendrick; David Hinkler; Tony Perrin; John Clayton

Artery are a British post-punk band from Sheffield, that was founded in 1978. They were commonly known and often confused as 'The'. In 1985, they split up after several changes in the line-up and the release of a total of four albums. They reformed in 2007 after being invited by Jarvis Cocker to perform at the Meltdown Festival.

== History ==
Artery evolved from earlier punk band named 'The' in 1978, with an original lineup of Mark Gouldthorpe (guitar), Toyce Ashley (vocals, guitar), Neil McKenzie (bass) and Garry Wilson (drums). After a self-financed single in 1979, the band released a second in 1980 on the Aardvark label, after which Mick Fidler (vocals, guitar, saxophone) was added. Two further singles followed in 1981, before Ashley left, with Gouldthorpe taking over on vocals and Simon Hinkler (formerly of TV Product) joining on keyboards and guitar. They received support from John Peel, for whom they recorded their first session for his BBC Radio 1 show in July 1981, recording a second early the following year. They signed to the Red Flame label in 1982, releasing a single and the Dale Griffin-produced mini-LP Oceans that year. Their track "Into the Garden" reached number nine in the 1982 Festive Fifty. They were often compared to Joy Division, although Gouldthorpe stated "We never listened to Joy Division – they were never an influence". Further lineup changes followed, with John White replacing Fidler, who was sacked for missing rehearsals, Christopher Hendrick replacing MacKenzie, and David Hinkler joining on keyboards. The band was reduced to a trio of Gouldthorpe, Wilson, and Hendrick by the time of the release of their second album, One Afternoon in a Hot Air Balloon (1983), with White leaving to form UV Pop and Simon Hinkler moving into production. Simon and David Hinkler and Garry Wilson all played in Pulp around 1983. In 1984 Hendrick left, with MacKenzie returning, and the band moved on to the Golden Dawn label, adding Murray Fenton to the lineup. A third album, The Second Coming, was released in 1984. Simon Hinkler briefly returned, with band manager Tony Perrin added on bass. A live album was released in 1985, by which time the band had split up, after Fenton had joined The Batfish Boys.

Gouldthorpe and Simon Hinkler collaborated on a further album, Flight Commander Solitude & the Snake in 1986, and Hinkler went on to join The Mission. They collaborated on a second album, A Room Full of This, in 1992, working together under the name The Flight Commander.

A compilation of demos, live tracks and interviews, Afterwards, was released in 1985 on the Pleasantly Surprised label.

Gouldthorpe moved away from music to run his own hair salon, stating in 2009 "I lost it with music for a bit and went into dark corners".

The band reformed in 2007 after being invited to perform at the Meltdown Festival by long-time fan Jarvis Cocker, and recorded a session for Marc Riley's BBC 6 Music show. The band stayed together, releasing the Standing Still EP in 2009. In 2010 they decided to split up again after David Hinkler decided to leave, but continued after recruiting James Bacon to replace him. A new album, Civilisation, was released in October 2011.

== Discography ==
=== Albums ===
- Oceans (1982), Red Flame
- One Afternoon in a Hot Air Balloon (1983), Red Flame - UK Indie No. 15
- The Second Coming (1984), Golden Dawn
- Number 4: Live in Amsterdam (1985), Golden Dawn
- Meltdown: Live 2007 (2007) - live album
- Civilisation (2011), Twin Speed

=== Compilations ===
- Afterwards: Recordings from 1979-1983 (1985), Pleasantly Surprised
- Into the Garden: An Artery Collection (2006), Cherry Red

=== Singles, EPs ===
- "Mother Moon" (1979), Limited Edition
- "Unbalanced" (1980), Aardvark - double-7-inch with a second live EP
- "Cars in Motion" (1981), Aardvark
- "Into the Garden" (1981), Armageddon
- "The Clown" (1982), Red Flame
- "Alabama Song" (1983), Red Flame
- "A Big Machine" (1984), Golden Dawn
- Diamonds in the Mine EP (1984), Golden Dawn
- Standing Still EP (23 February 2009), Phantom Power

=== DVD ===
- 3 Days in June: the Reformation of Artery (2009), Sheffield Vision
