= Jon McClure =

English rock singer

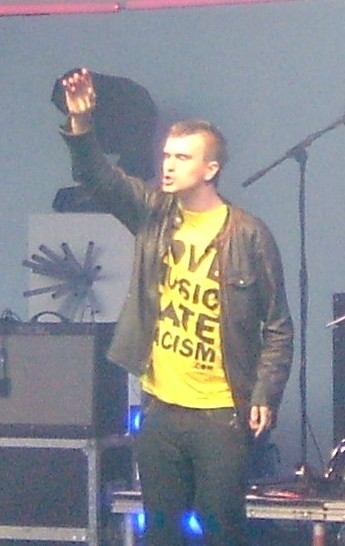
- McClure performing with Reverend and the Makers in 2008

Background information
- Born: Jon McClure; 22 December 1981 (age 44); Sheffield, England
- Genres: Indie rock; dance-rock; baggy; electronic
- Occupation: Musician
- Instruments: Vocals; guitar
- Years active: 2004–present
- Label: Wall of Sound

Jon McClure (born 22 December 1981), known as The Reverend, is an English musician. He is the lead singer and frontman of Reverend and The Makers, and ex-vocalist of 1984 and Judan Suki. He says that the name "Reverend" became his moniker because "I'm a big mouth and always running on at people".

== Early life ==
Jon McClure was born in the Sheffield suburb Grenoside, and grew up there with his parents and brother Chris. He has known Ed Cosens since childhood and in Notre Dame High School. He went on to become a poet, and began blogging on the internet.

== Early career ==
=== Judan Suki ===
McClure's first band was Judan Suki, which featured Ed Cosens and Laura Manuel from The Makers. The name Judan Suki is Japanese, meaning "being kicked in the weak spot". The band had around 10 members, including Alex Turner and Matt Helders of the Arctic Monkeys. Judan Suki played around Sheffield, headlining venues such as the Boardwalk and Foundry Sheffield at Sheffield University in 2002. One of their live tracks included a cover of "Brothers on the Slide" by Cymande, although a studio version was never recorded.

=== 1984 ===
In 2003, Judan Suki downsized from eight members to five to become 1984, named after the novel by George Orwell. Ed Cosens remained in the band, and co-wrote many of 1984's songs as well as all of Reverend and The Makers. The short-lived band existed from 2004 to 2005, and McClure's lyrics and vocals became angrier during this period due to his strong opposition to the Iraq War. "God Is In The TV", one of the B-sides on a later Reverend and the Makers single, was originally a 1984 song. The band came to an end when McClure decided to pursue a more professional career, leading to Reverend and the Makers.

=== Collaboration with Alex Turner ===
McClure developed a close friendship with Alex Turner of Arctic Monkeys, after meeting Turner on a bus and asking if he wanted to join his band at the time. McClure and Turner have co-written songs including "He Said He Loved Me", "The Machine", and "Old Yellow Bricks", and also shared a flat.

== Side projects ==
=== Reverend Soundsystem ===
Prior to Reverend and the Makers being signed, McClure hosted a monthly club night named "Reverend Soundsystem" (RSS), on the first Saturday of every month at The Plug in Sheffield, and has also hosted one event at Manchester's Po Na Na. The Soundsystem, which ran for a year from October 2007 and has featured a number of guest DJs such as Mani (The Stone Roses/Primal Scream), Peter Hook (New Order), Andy Nicholson (ex-Arctic Monkeys), Chris McClure (face of the Arctic Monkeys debut album cover (Whatever People Say I Am, That's What I'm Not) and brother of Jon), Terry Hall (The Specials), Milburn, Bez and Arctic Monkeys as well as live performances from The Sunshine Underground, Gas Club, Stoney, The 747s, The Hosts, White Rose Movement and Starlings (FKA Kelham Crisis). The event no longer takes place at The Plug.

In 2010, McClure formed a band in Sheffield named after the club night. He recruited his Makers-bandmate and wife Laura McClure to join him, with Ocelot and Maticmouth, a Sheffield MC and former classmate of Jon. The band includes Jon, Maticmouth, Laura McClure and Jimmy Welsh (who replaced Jagz Kooner). RSS began touring the UK in 2010 for the Boxfreshers event. In September, Laura McClure revealed the band would release a single titled "Wife Her Up" on 22 November. The band have been playing house parties up and down the country and Laura stated there would be more of these to come, but did not expand on the possibility of a debut album.

=== Mongrel ===
McClure's new project features band members Lowkey, Andy Nicholson, Matt Helders, Drew McConnell, Joe Moscow, and Jagz Kooner.

== Personal life ==
McClure's influences include The Clash, Oasis, The Stone Roses, The Beatles and The Jam. On another occasions he has cited his key influences as Bob Marley, Oasis and John Cooper Clarke. McClure was part of a collective that set up "Instigate Debate" in August 2008.

McClure married fellow Reverend and The Makers member Laura Manuel in the summer of 2009.

McClure is a lifelong Sheffield Wednesday fan. He is known to be an avid player of the simulation game Football Manager. In September 2009, he became the first member of the public to play Football Manager 2010 upon its release. McClure's great uncle, Joe McClure, played for Everton FC in the same team as Dixie Dean in the 1930s. In March 2026, McClure was named the new chairman of Sheffield F.C.

In an edition of The Wright Stuff, he said that he "absolutely loves" smoking. In March 2010, he was arrested in Inverness after possession of cannabis, but was given a caution.

== Political views ==
In November 2019, along with 34 other musicians, McClure signed a letter endorsing the Labour Party leader Jeremy Corbyn in the 2019 UK general election with a call to end austerity.
