= Bromheads Jacket =

British garage rock band

- Origin: Sheffield, England
- Genres: Indie rock, garage rock
- Years active: 2005–2013, 2024–present
- Label: Marquis Chacha
- Members: Tim Hampton; Jono West; Joe Green
- Past members: Dan Potter

Bromheads Jacket (briefly Bromheads) are an English three-piece post punk band, formed in 2005 in Sheffield.

== History ==
Bromheads formed in Sheffield in 2005, following the split of a band called Fixated. Although often compared to other Sheffield bands who found fame around the same time, such as Arctic Monkeys and Milburn, the band is heavier than others in their scene. Their style also differs due to singer Tim Hampton's southern England accent (he was raised in Yateley, Hampshire).

The band released the singles "Woolley Bridge", "What Ifs + Maybes", "Trip to the Golden Arches"', "Lesley Parlafitt", and "Speaker Box", all released on the Marquis Chacha label. They went on several tours of the UK, and also played across Europe, including in Spain (at the Summercase Festival), Austria, Germany, and the Netherlands. In 2005, they joined the nationwide Club NME tour, and played at South By Southwest in Austin, Texas.

Their first album, Dits from the Commuter Belt, was released on 13 November 2006, and was followed by a tour of over 30 gigs around the UK supported by the Middlesbrough group The Oxfam Glamour Models. They have also played at the London Calling festival in Amsterdam on three occasions, twice in 2006 and once in 2008.

In 2006, the band recorded a cover of The Streets' single "When You Wasn't Famous", which was released on the b-side of the song's 7". The single reached number 8 in the UK charts.

Their song "Fight Music for the Fight" was featured in the video game Burnout Dominator, as well as its successor Burnout Paradise on PS3 and Xbox 360.

Their second album, On The Brain, was released on 22 September 2008.

In September 2009, the band released the single "Boots" (a cover of "These Boots Are Made For Walkin'") as a free download on their official website, but under the name Bromheads, dropping the name word Jacket, as a result of losing the bass player Jono West. Tim Hampton and Dan Potter said they would continue as a two-piece band. It was then confirmed that the band would release a free single every month for a year, finishing in November 2010 with their final free song, "Chocolate Factory". In December 2010, they released, as Bromheads, their third album, called The Lamp Sessions, with 10 original tracks from the last 12 months available singles.

In late 2012, the band released the EP Holding the Gun and announced that they were working on a new album to be released the following year. Their fourth album, Choro, which contained a new song "Gonna Let You Melt", was released on 15 April 2013, available to download at their website.

In 2024, Bromheads are back with the Jacket. As written on their new website:

"When Bromheads Jacket emerged as a key member of the Sheffield indie scene of the noughties, nobody knew how to pigeon hole them. Lead singer and songwriter Tim Hampton sang, not in with Yorkshire twang but in a thick Surrey accent. His band were heavier than everyone else. “The streets with guitars” was about the best the music press could come up with to describe what was, at that point a new sound.

Bromheads Jackets meanwhile imploded due to self sabotage. Hampton’s honest assessment is that they “fucked it up”. Now, they’re back with a bunch of new material, sounding better to reclaim their title as forerunners to the modern post punk scene. "Some bands are incredibly popular. Others are important and influential. Bromheads Jacket 2.0 might yet be both."

- Jon 'The Reverend' McClure

== Discography ==
=== Albums ===
- Dits from the Commuter Belt (2006)
- On The Brain (2008)
- The Lamp Sessions (2010) (as Bromheads)
- Choro (2013) (as Bromheads)

=== Extended plays ===
- Lost Fables (2024)

=== Singles ===
- Woolley Bridge (2006)
- What Ifs and Maybes (2006)
- Trip to the Golden Arches (2006)
- Lesley Parlafitt (2007)
- Speaker Box (2008)
- Turn Me On (2008)
- Juiced Up (2024)
- The Grind (2024)

=== Singles (as Bromheads) ===
- Boots (October 2009)
- Hole in the Head (November 2009)
- Edey (December 2009)
- Magic Number (January 2010)
- Dedicated (February 2010)
- Snow (March 2010)
- Fan of the Vagrants (May 2010)
- Blinkers On (June 2010)
- Cinderella's (July 2010)
- Friends (August 2010)
- Least of Her Worries (September 2010)
- Chocolate Factory (November 2010)
