= Love and Other Catastrophes (album) =

Love And Other Catastrophes
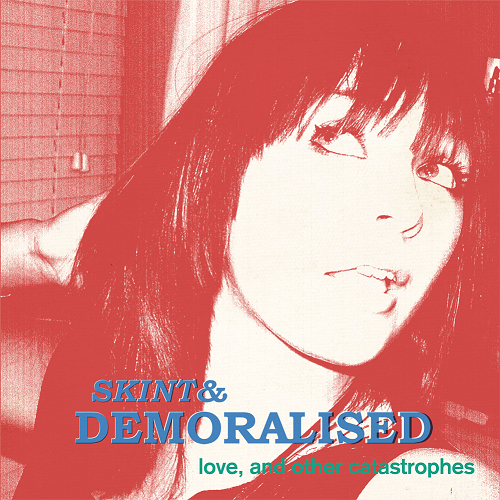

Studio album by Skint & Demoralised
- Released: 2 August 2011
- Genre: Alternative pop
- Label: Heist or Hit Records
- Producer: MiNI dOG

Skint & Demoralised chronology
Love And Other Catastrophes (2011)	This Sporting Life (2011)

Singles from Love And Other Catastrophes
- 1. "The Thrill of Thirty Seconds" Released: 17 November 2008; 2. "This Song Is Definitely Not About You" Released: 2 March 2009; 3. "Red Lipstick" Released: 13 July 2009

Love And Other Catastrophes is the debut studio album by the Wakefield band, Skint & Demoralised. The album was written in 2007, recorded in 2008 and planned for release in 2009. Full-length promotional copies leaked heavily on the internet over the summer of 2009 and the band were dropped by their old label at the expense of the planned release. However, it was officially released on 2 August 2011 on Heist or Hit Records alongside the band's follow-up.

== Track listing ==
No.	Title	Length
1.	"Three More Days"	4:05
2.	"It's Only Been A Week"	3:18
3.	"Red Lipstick"	3:02
4.	"One Way Traffic"	4:03
5.	"Failing To See The Attraction"	3:08
6.	"Withdrawal Symptoms"	4:42
7.	"Let's Get Lost"	3:10
8.	"The Thrill of Thirty Seconds"	3:38
9.	"You Probably Don't Even Realise When You Do The Things I Love The Most"	3:02
10.	"Only Lust Ignores Violence Involving Ambulances"	3:16
11.	"This Song Is Definitely Not About You"	3:22
12.	"A Few Quiet Drinks"	3:39

== Personnel ==
- Written by Abbott/Gledhill
- Produced by MiNI dOG
- Performed by The Dap-Kings, David Gledhill, Tracey Wilkinson, Eddie Hick, Matt Abbott
- Mixed by MiNI dOG, except for tracks 3, 5, 8, 9 and 11 which were mixed by Jeremy Wheatley
- Engineered by Ewan Davies and Richard Woodcraft
- Mastered by Tim Young
- Artwork designed by Nathan McGrory

== Notes ==
- Recorded at The Daptone Studios in New York, RAK Studios in London and 6x7 Studios in Sheffield
- Mastered at Metropolis Studios

== Recording and production ==
After signing a deal with Mercury Records, the duo were flown out to New York City to begin recording with legendary soul session band The Dap-Kings at their studio in Brooklyn. Additional work was added at their home studio in Sheffield before sessions were completed at RAK Studios in London.

The album was produced by MiNI dOG, which allowed Skint & Demoralised to retain full creative control. As well as the authentic sounds of The Dap-Kings, a full orchestra was recorded for tracks 6 and 12.

On the original full-length promotional copy that was distributed in 2009 - the reason for the album 'leaking' heavily on Illegal file sharing sites - there were spoken word interludes included on the track-listing. These included Abbott's distinctive poems, although they were removed from the official 2011 release.

== Critical reception ==
The album never received its official release during the promotional cycle in 2008 and 2009, although the band received high critical praise around this time. A full-page feature in the Sunday Times Culture Magazine highlighted their popularity amongst broadsheet journalists. They were tipped for success across the board, including a feature in The Guardian at the start of 2009.
