= First Love, Last Rites (disambiguation) =

First Love, Last Rites is 1975 short-story collection by Ian McEwan.

First Love, Last Rites may also refer to:

- First Love, Last Rites (film), a 1997 adaptation of the title story of McEwan's collection
- First Love, Last Rites (musical group), a Swedish pop-rock band
- First Love / Last Rites, a 1989 album by Cock Robin
