= Hold Fast (album) =

Studio album by The Crookes
- Released: July 9, 2012 (UK); October 1, 2013 (US)
- Recorded: 2012
- Genre: Indie pop
- Length: 33:07
- Label: Fierce Panda
- Producer: Matt Peel

The Crookes chronology
Chasing After Ghosts (2011)	Hold Fast (2012)	Soapbox (2014)

Singles from Hold Fast
- 1. "Afterglow" Released: April 9, 2012; 2. "Maybe in the Dark" Released: July 23, 2012; 3. "American Girls" Released: November 26, 2012

Hold Fast was the second full length studio album released by Sheffield-based indie pop group The Crookes. Produced by long-time collaborator Matt Peel, it was recorded in February 2012 and released on Fierce Panda Records on 9 July 2012. Three tracks from the album were released as singles, and the album generally received positive reviews in the media.

Hold Fast was the first Crookes album to feature guitarist Tom Dakin, who was brought in to temporarily fill in on an autumn tour of Europe and the UK when founding member Alex Saunders left the band in September 2011; Dakin has since become a permanent member of the band. As was the case with their 2010 EP Dreaming of Another Day and 2011 debut album Chasing After Ghosts, all lyrics on this album were penned by guitarist Daniel Hopewell.

== Background ==
Hopewell was inspired to title the album Hold Fast after a late night conversation the band had with friend Richard Hawley, in which Hawley explained to them that "...sailors used to tattoo 'HOLD FAST' across their knuckles...they couldn't hear each other speak because of all the gunshots, but they [had] tattooed 'HOLD FAST' [on their hands] and they'd grip onto their oars and keep going, and eventually all the blood would drain from their hands, but the message would still be there [visible] in ink. And I just thought it was such a fantastic metaphor for being in a band, for sticking it out and keeping going that it seemed the most perfect song choice and title choice for this album."

To raise funds for touring and other incidentals, the Crookes started a PledgeMusic campaign in spring 2012 based around the release of Hold Fast. Fans who pre-ordered Hold Fast through the project had exclusive access to purchase limited edition and rare Crookes merchandise such as shirts worn by the band, signed guitars, and personalised lyric sheets, as well as to purchase unusual special events like a private guitar lesson with the band to learn a Crookes song, a gig in a fan's living room, and a five-a-side football match in which the band themselves would play the sport with their fans.

The Crookes' PledgeMusic campaign site provided a physical location to host fan exclusives, including the "Hold Fast Interviews" series in which the band members took turns interviewing each other on camera. In the series, Hopewell was interviewed by drummer Russell Bates and revealed that Hold Fast was a happier album lyrically than Chasing After Ghosts because he suffers "quite badly from seasonal affective disorder" and "in winter when it's cold, I just generally find it impossible to write happy songs because I'm always quite miserable, but then this last album, which was written while we were abroad, and it was sunny, and it was an incredible time, so I think it was impossible for me to be unhappy when it is like that." When the album was released in July 2012, the campaign had raised funds over 124% of the band's original goal. The campaign's Web site stated that "a percentage of our proceeds [will go] to Sheffield Children's Hospital Charity Fund..."

Hopewell has admitted in interviews that ninth track "Where Did Our Love Go?" is a "painfully honest" account of emotions surrounding founding member Alex Saunders' voluntary decision to leave the band in 2011 but the process of writing the lyrics to the song proved "quite cathartic". The words to closing track "The I Love You Bridge" were based on a real life marriage proposal that was spray painted in April 2001 to the side of a bridge in Park Hill, a Sheffield council housing estate east of the city centre; the message on the bridge has since become an iconic landmark in the city. Singer and bassist George Waite had seen a newspaper article about the bridge, saved the newspaper clipping, and displayed it prominently on their refrigerator door, hoping that Hopewell would "pick up on it" and find the story interesting enough to write a song about its history. Hopewell has explained, "The fact which illuminated the phrase ‘I love you, will you marry me?’ is that they left the name just as it is and that in itself sounds like a Crookes song – that kind of idea with a name framed for obscurity that runs through a lot of our songs. I think we often get labelled as romantics, which is fair to a certain extent, but a lot of the time that conjures up a slightly wide-eyed image as the reality of a lot of romance is really dark and associated with things like death and suicide. Apparently, twenty-six people killed themselves by jumping from this landmark, and that idea that people kill themselves from the thing called ‘I Love You Bridge’ was incredible and very inspiring."

The album was recorded in March 2012 at Cottage Road Studios in Leeds by Matt Peel, who was also on production duties for their 2011 debut album Chasing After Ghosts.

== Release ==
The release of Hold Fast was preceded by the release of single "Afterglow" in April 2012. To promote the release of the album, in early May on their Tumblr the band gave away the track "American Girls", which was released as a single in its own right in November 2012.

On 11 June 2013, the Crookes announced they had signed their first American recording contract with Austin-based indie label Modern Outsider, stating further that they would be releasing a special version of Hold Fast in America later in 2013 and would be playing live dates there before the end of the year. Modern Outsider revealed on 17 July 2013 that the American version of Hold Fast, including bonus tracks of previously released UK "Afterglow" b-side "Honey" and May 2013 singles "Bear's Blood" and "Dance in Colour," will be released in the U.S. on 1 October 2013.

== Track listing ==
All lyrics are written by Daniel Hopewell; all music is composed by The Crookes.

No.	Title	Length
1.	"Afterglow"	2.35
2.	"Maybe in the Dark"	2.29
3.	"Stars"	3.02
4.	"American Girls"	3.40
5.	"The Cooler King"	2.04
6.	"Hold Fast"	4.08
7.	"Sal Paradise"	3.47
8.	"Sofie"	3.50
9.	"Where Did Our Love Go?"	3.19
10.	"The I Love You Bridge"	4.16
Total length:		33.07

Extra track on the 'Bonus Version' (digital download)
No.	Title	Length
1.	"Collecting Skies"	3.17

Extra tracks on the Japanese edition
No.	Title	Length
1.	"Honey"
2.	"Japanese Girls"
3.	"Collecting Skies"

Extra tracks on the American edition
No.	Title	Length
1.	"Honey"
2.	"Bear's Blood"
3.	"Dance in Colour"

== Reception ==
Professional ratings
Review scores
Source	Rating
Q	8/10 stars
God is in the TV	8/10 stars
The Fly	7/10 stars
This Is Fake DIY	7/10 stars
BBC	neutral
There Goes the Fear	9/10 stars
The Upcoming	8/10 stars

Hold Fast generally received good reviews by the online music press and was supported by BBC radio presenters Steve Lamacq, Chris Hawkins and Shaun Keaveny on BBC Radio 6 Music. Influential British music magazine Q appreciated the album's brevity yet substance, saying, "Not a second on these 33 watertight minutes are wasted." Laura Prior of God is in the TV complimented the whimsy of the release, stating, "In short, if you have a passing interest in placing your arms in upwardly turned right angles and doing the invisible hoola [sic] hoop, this album will pay furious dividends. Surely there can be no higher praise?" Linda Aust of This Is Fake DIY said of the album, "The Crookes have managed to create a homogeneous and varied album that might have fit better into the 60s but is nonetheless utterly listenable with its characteristically retro feel, abundance of jangly guitars and soaring vocals. Framed by vibrant harmonies and perfect pop, The Crookes definitely deserve their break-through this time around."

In his review for The Fly, Robert Cooke said, "They’re a dying breed are bands like The Crookes, making romantic rock ‘n’ roll the old-fashioned way. This lovestruck lot wear their hearts on their sleeves, and they sure has hell don’t hide their hooks. ‘Hold Fast’ is easily their finest work yet, from the hormone-fuelled thrills of ‘Afterglow’ to the startling sincerity of ‘The I Love You Bridge.’" In reviewing the album for the BBC, Mike Diver praised the vocals of lead singer Waite: "The Crookes better hold attentions when they slow down. The I Love You Bridge is a beautiful closer with a committed, affecting lead vocal from George Waite, and the a cappella intro to American Girls is of equal appeal."

In her review of Hold Fast, Mary Chang of There Goes the Fear said of the album, "They haven’t changed their sound so much to the point of unrecognisable from their previous releases; what they have done is started playing and writing smarter, both instrumentally and lyrically...With complaints far and wide that guitar rock is dead, ‘Hold Fast’ flies in the face of these ill-begotten rumours and grins widely." Simon Franklin of The Upcoming described the album as one "that requires more than one listen for it's [sic] more hidden joys on some of the tracks, and the more upbeat sounds such as Afterglow are instantly favourites producing a diverse and fun album."

== Personnel ==
- Russell Bates (drums)
- Daniel Hopewell (guitar)
- George Waite (vocals, bass guitar)
- Tom Dakin (guitar)
