= Skint & Demoralised =

British alternative indie/pop act

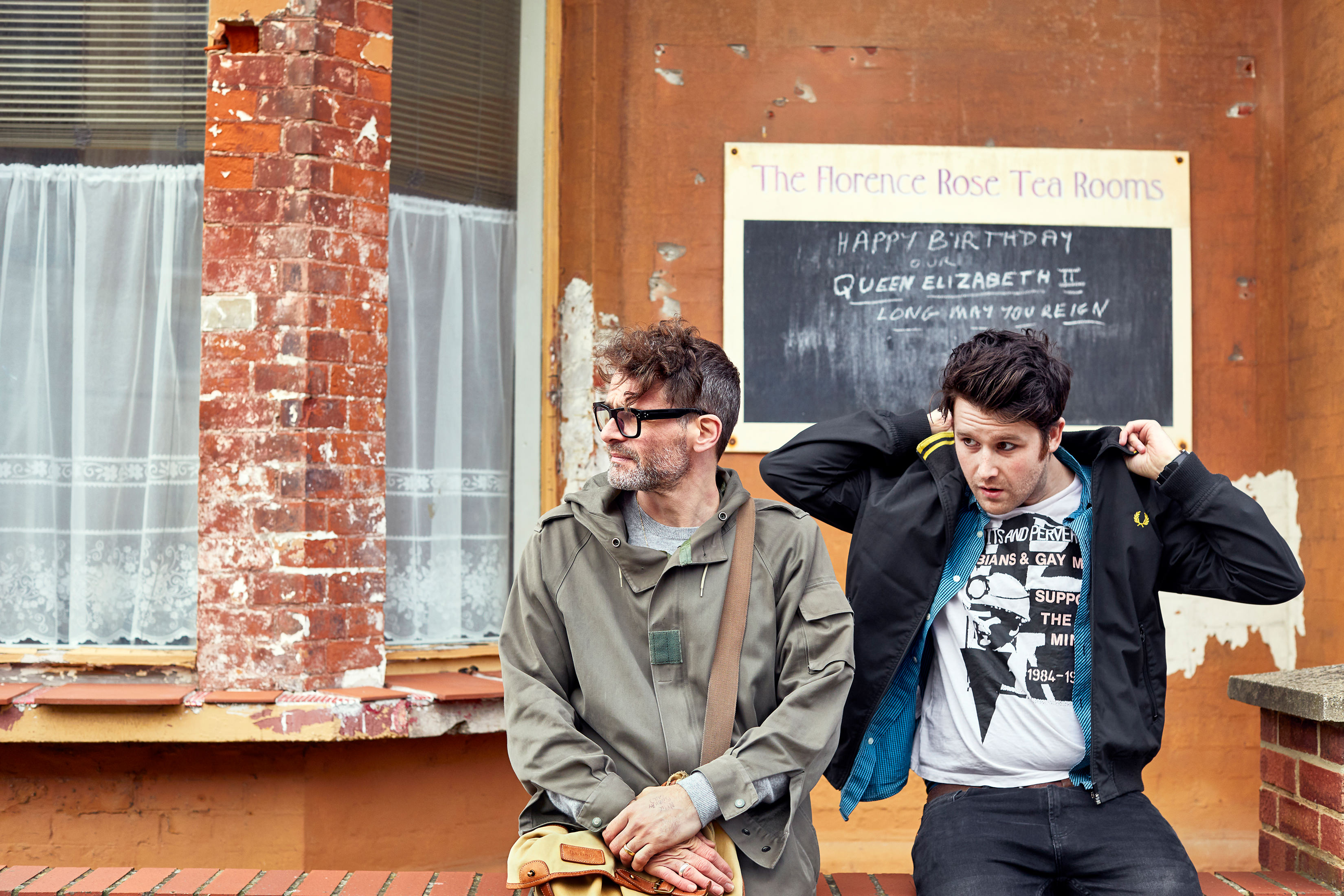

Background information
- Origin: Wakefield and Sheffield, Yorkshire, England
- Genres: Pop, indie, spoken word
- Years active: 2007–2013, 2019–present
- Labels: Mercury (2008–10), Heist Or Hit (2011–2013), Fierce Panda (2019–present)
- Members: Matt Abbott; David Gledhill
- Website: skintanddemoralised.net

Skint & Demoralised are a British alternative indie/pop act, fronted by lyricist Matt Abbott from Wakefield, West Yorkshire and produced by David Gledhill from Sheffield, South Yorkshire. Formed in 2007, the band released several records and toured the UK between 2007 and 2013. After spending six years pursuing individual projects, Skint & Demoralised announced a new single, which was released on Fierce Panda in spring 2019.

== Early years and formation ==
Skint & Demoralised began when Wakefield teenager Matt Abbott started doing stand-up performance poetry in late 2006. With themes such as tales from seaside towns and tragic nights-out, he was often a hit with a pleasantly surprised audience. These included support slots for Reverend and the Makers, Last Gang and The Research. Abbott also performed for Love Music Hate Racism and was later to take part in a House of Commons press conference on racism.

In 2007, Abbott was contacted on MySpace by producer MiNI dOG, with whom he began to write. MiNI dOG began to turn Abbott's poetry into songs by chopping them apart and laying them over backing tracks before the two had even met. However, after meeting the pair developed a strong songwriting partnership, with Abbott writing lyrics and MiNI dOG writing the music and producing demos. In 2008 they released a debut single, "The Thrill Of Thirty Seconds".

After uploading demos onto MySpace, free download sites and also posting CDs out to DJs, the band were played and interviewed on various radio shows including Steve Lamacq on BBC Radio 1 and BBC 6 Music, Shamir Masri's 'Raw Talent' on BBC Radio Sheffield and on Yorkshire Radio. The band also received airplay on BBC Radio 1 from Colin Murray and Huw Stephens and, in March 2008, recorded a live session at Maida Vale Studios for Steve Lamacq.

The band signed to Mercury Records in March 2008 (part of the Universal Music Group) and released three singles, however, after recording an album in New York, the act parted company with the label in 2010.

== Live performances ==
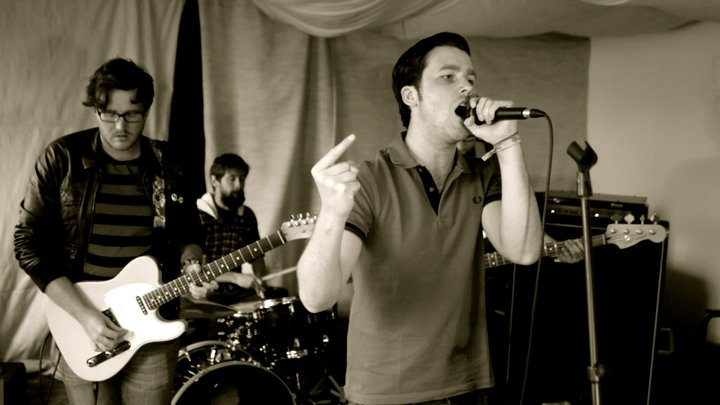
Video still from 43 Degrees

Skint & Demoralised's first headline UK tour was in February 2009 and included dates across the UK. One distinguishing feature of the live sets is Abbott's spoken word poems. During early live performances, he would recite the anti-racism poem BNP: Nazis on the Doorstep and often climbed on top of a nearby monitor or fixture to do so. He has supported and performed with Love Music Hate Racism since his early career and has often spoken of his support for the organisation in interviews.

In addition to supporting one of Abbott's main influences, poet John Cooper Clarke, at The Duchess in York, the band performed at several new music festivals in 2009 such as Camden Crawl in London and The Great Escape in Brighton as well as major festivals such as Glastonbury Festival, Wireless Festival in Hyde Park, London, Latitude Festival in Suffolk, Leeds and Reading Festival and Bestival on the Isle of Wight. Over the summer of 2010, Abbott also performed several spoken word/stand-up comedy gigs which included dates at Latitude Festival and Leeds Festival.

2011 saw them tour the UK to promote the release of their first two albums, with headline shows alongside support slots for Art Brut, The Crookes and John Cooper Clarke. They ended the year headlining the Full English Christmas festival in Berlin and Dresden, alongside other English acts including The Lovely Eggs. Their 2019 comeback show took place at London indie venue The Social in Fitzrovia.

== Debut album, Love, And Other Catastrophes ==
Whilst signed to Mercury, Skint & Demoralised recorded their debut album Love And Other Catastrophes in 2008 with funk/soul session band The Dap-Kings at The Daptone Studios in Brooklyn, New York. The second half of the session was at RAK Studios in St John's Wood, London, produced by Gledhill, credited as MiNI dOG. MiNI dOG also mixed eight of the tracks, with the other four being mixed by Jeremy Wheatley.

The single "Red Lipstick" was released July 2009 by Mercury. As well as a TV appearance and performance on Loose Women, they enjoyed national airplay over the summer of 2009 with the single "Red Lipstick", spending several weeks on the BBC Radio 1 B-List and being chosen as the "Weekend Anthem" by Sara Cox. This single was also included in the playlist for the long running BBC TV series Waterloo Road series 5, episode 7 and features alongside debut single "The Thrill of Thirty Seconds" in the series 3 soundtrack for BBC TV series Gavin & Stacey. National broadsheet and tabloid press followed from Q Magazine, Clash Magazine, The Independent, and The Sunday Times' Culture magazine and The Guardian.

However, the album was leaked online months before it was due to be released, which included full-length promotional copies being sold on eBay and large numbers of downloads through illegal file sharing. It was never officially released by Mercury Records, but was eventually released by indie label Heist Or Hit alongside the band's second album This Sporting Life in summer 2011. The album was also released on 12" vinyl with bonus tracks, by German indie label Firestation Records in 2011.

== Second album, This Sporting Life ==
On 21 September 2010, Abbott announced via his Twitter and Facebook pages that the band would be reforming, after it was initially announced over a year ago that they had split up in favour of a solo project from Abbott. A second album was written and recorded in the last few months of the year at MiNI dOG's home studio in Sheffield.

Videos were made for demo tracks from the second album, setting the songs to stills from Abbott's favourite films including A Taste of Honey, Saturday Night and Sunday Morning, L'Appartement, Amélie and Trainspotting.

With a new line up the band played several live dates over spring 2011 and announced that they'd signed a deal with Indie label Heist Or Hit Records. Both the band's new album This Sporting Life and their previously unreleased debut Love And Other Catastrophes were released as a 2CD Bonus Edition on 2 August 2011.

The new album was named after the 1963 Wakefield based kitchen-sink drama of the same name.

== Third album, The Bit Between The Teeth ==
In August 2012, the third album, The Bit Between The Teeth, was announced in an interview on a Canadian music site, with an official announcement detailing the band's single release on the record label's website in 2013. In the same announcement, the release date for the album was given as 8 April 2013. The band announced later in July that this album would be their last as Skint & Demoralised.

== Fourth album, We Are Humans ==
In March 2019, Skint & Demoralised announced that they had reformed following a six-year hiatus. Their single, "Boro Kitchen 4am", was released by Fierce Panda Records on 29 March and received its first national radio airplay on Steve Lamacq's BBC Radio 6 Music show on 2 April. This was followed-up by "#RefugeesWelcome", which was released on 14 June, which was also premiered by Lamacq on BBC 6 Music (on 20 June). A third single "Superheroes" was released on 16 August, a fortnight before the album's digital release, and fourth single "Slim Jim's Liquor Store" fronted an EP release to coincide with the vinyl release of the album.

Fourth album We Are Humans was released digitally on 30 August, and on limited edition white vinyl on 25 October. The first three tracks from the album were written following a conversation between Abbott and Gledhill about Sleaford Mods, a band which Abbott had opened for as a poet and whose Sleaford Mods: Invisible Britain documentary he featured in as a political poet in 2015, and also Idles, who Gledhill introduced to Abbott for inspiration.

== Discography ==
=== Albums ===
- Love And Other Catastrophes – (unofficial promo release 2009, full release 2 August 2011) – Download, CD and 12" vinyl
- This Sporting Life – (initial release 2 August 2011, full release 12 March 2012) – Download and CD
- The Bit Between The Teeth (8 April 2013) – Download only
- We Are Humans (30 August 2019) – Download and limited edition white 12" vinyl (25 October)

=== Singles ===
- "The Thrill of Thirty Seconds" (17 November 2008) – Limited release 500 copy 7" vinyl
- "This Song Is Definitely Not About You" (2 March 2009) – CD & 7" vinyl
- "Red Lipstick" (13 July 2009, UK #100) – Download only
- "The Lonely Hearts of England"/"43 Degrees" (4 July 2011) – Download only
- "All The Rest Is Propaganda" (5 March 2012) – Download only
- "Breakfast at Sylvia's" (25 March 2013) – Download only
- "Plessey Road" (17 June 2013) – Download only
- "Boro Kitchen 4am" (29 March 2019) – Download only
- "#RefugeesWelcome" (14 June 2019) – Download only
- "Superheroes" (16 August 2019) – Download only
- "Slim Jim's Liquor Store" EP (26 October 2019) – Download only
