= Lifeline (The Answering Machine album) =

Studio album by The Answering Machine
- Released: 21 February 2011
- Genre: Indie rock
- Length: 44:43
- Label: Heist Or Hit Records
- Producer: Martin Colclough

The Answering Machine chronology
| Another City, Another Sorry (2009) | Lifeline (2011) |

Singles from Lifeline
- 1. "Animals" Released: 17 October 2010; 2. "Lifeline" Released: 4 February 2011

Lifeline is the second and final studio album by Manchester band The Answering Machine. It was released on 21 February 2011 in the United Kingdom on Heist or Hit Records.

== Track listing ==
| No. | Title | Length |
|---|---|---|
| 1. | "My Little Navy" | 3:45 |
| 2. | "Lifeline" | 4:20 |
| 3. | "Animals" | 3:49 |
| 4. | "3 Miles" | 4:12 |
| 5. | "Romantic And Square" | 2:32 |
| 6. | "Anything Anything" | 5:23 |
| 7. | "Hospital Lung" | 3:38 |
| 8. | "Rules" | 4:42 |
| 9. | "Video 8" | 4:19 |
| 10. | "So Alive" | 4:22 |
| 11. | "The End" | 3:41 |

== Personnel ==
- Martin Colclough - vocals, guitar
- Pat Fogarty - guitar, backing vocals
- Gemma Evans - bass, backing vocals
- Ben Perry - drums, glockenspiel
