= The T.S. Eliot Appreciation Society =

Dutch indie folk band

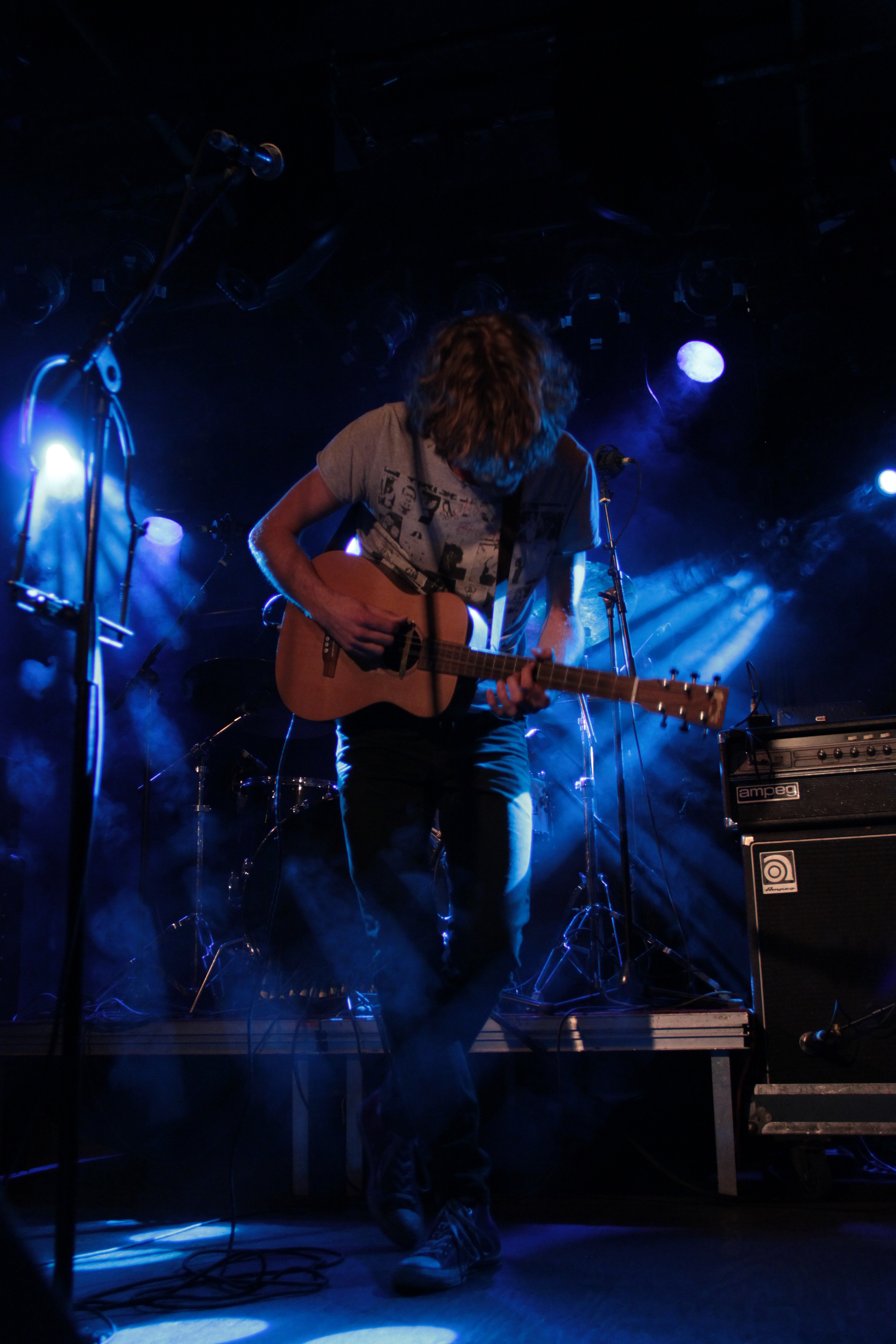
- The T.S. Eliot Appreciation Society performing at LVC Leiden, Netherlands, 2013.

Background information
- Origin: Utrecht, Netherlands
- Genres: Indie folk
- Years active: 2011–present
- Label: V2 Benelux
- Members: Tom Gerritsen
- Website: http://www.thetseliotappreciationsociety.com

The T.S. Eliot Appreciation Society is an indie folk band from the Netherlands, founded by singer-songwriter Tom Gerritsen in 2011.

== Overview ==
After busking for several years on the streets of major cities in Canada and the United States, Tom Gerritsen returned to Utrecht, Netherlands to record a lo-fi EP. After the release, The T.S. Eliot Appreciation Society played a string of well-received shows throughout the Netherlands, alternating between smaller and larger venues, such as the Effenaar and Tivoli and sharing the stage with the likes of I Am Oak, Absynthe Minded, Simon Joyner and Rivulets. In 2013, a debut album entitled A New History was recorded in New Ground Studio in Utrecht, with the assistance of members from the post-rock band We vs. Death. The record was released in the fall of 2013.

== Discography ==
=== Studio albums ===
| Year | Title | Label |
|---|---|---|
| 2013 | A New History | V2 Benelux |

=== EPs ===
| Year | Title | Label |
|---|---|---|
| 2012 | s/t | Self-released |
