= This Sporting Life (Skint & Demoralised album) =

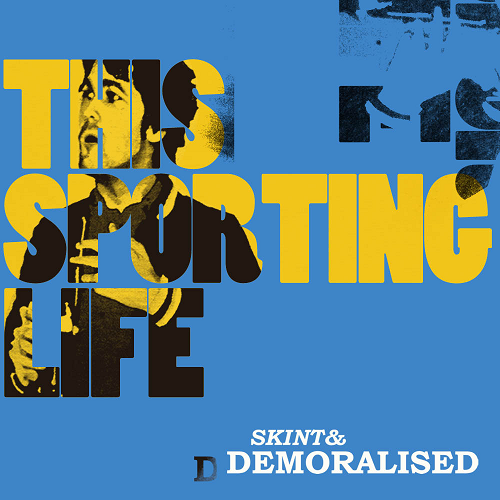

Studio album by Skint & Demoralised
- Released: 2 August 2011
- Genre: Indie pop
- Label: Heist or Hit Records
- Producer: MiNI dOG

Skint & Demoralised chronology
Love And Other Catastrophes (2011)	This Sporting Life (2011)

Singles from This Sporting Life
- 1. "The Lonely Hearts of England/43 Degrees" Released: 4 July 2011

This Sporting Life is the second studio album by Wakefield band Skint & Demoralised. The album was and recorded in 2010 and officially released on 2 August 2011 on Heist or Hit Records alongside the band's debut.

== Track listing ==
Tracklist:

No.	Title	Length
1.	"Hogmanay Heroes"	4:06
2.	"43 Degrees"	3:01
3.	"Maria, Full of Grace"	4:13
4.	"All The Rest Is Propaganda"	3:31
5.	"The Lonely Hearts of England"	3:57
6.	"Voluntary Confinement"	4:10
7.	"Maybe You Are After All?"	2:58
8.	"Did It All Go To Plan?"	4:28
9.	"Fireworks"	3:47
10.	"Lowlife"	4:52

== Personnel ==
- Written by Abbott/Gledhill
- Produced and Mixed by MiNI dOG
- Performed by David Gledhill, Matt Abbott
- Mastered by MiNI dOG
- Artwork designed by Nathan McGrory (original painting by Simon Abbott)

== Notes ==
- Recorded at 6x7 Studios in Sheffield

== Recording and production ==
In a stark contrast to the band's debut Love, And Other Catastrophes, This Sporting Life was recorded without a budget at their home studio in Sheffield. The album was again produced by MiNI dOG, and this time only featured Abbott and Gledhill as performers. One of the most distinguishing stylistic features is that it features Abbott singing consistently through every track, as opposed to the first album which had spoken word delivery on almost every verse.

== Reception ==
Whilst not receiving the same level of national coverage as the first album during the first month of release, This Sporting Life has managed to slowly gather a strong spectrum of positive reviews on smaller websites and blogs. As with their debut, the band's champion Steve Lamacq led the way on his 'Going Deaf For A Living' blog. Lamacq has also given the band heavy coverage on his BBC 6 Music and BBC Radio 2 shows, including a second 'New Favourite Band' feature for Skint & Demoralised on 17 August.

The album received many positive reviews on local sites such as 'Leeds Music Scene', 'The Sheffield Scenester' and 'Carpe Musica' (all of which are based in Yorkshire) as well as a few sites from further afield such as US-based blog 'There Goes The Fear', French site 'Sound of Violence' and German site 'Punk Rock Ist Nicht Tot'.

The video for the second single from the album - a free download of opening track 'Hogmanay Heroes' - was premièred exclusively on the Artrocker website ahead of its release in September 2011.

== Short stories ==
Whilst writing the lyrics to the album, Abbott also wrote a series of short stories which inspired and in turn were inspired by his lyrical ideas. Abbott has cited James Joyce's Dubliners and Alan Sillitoe's Saturday Night and Sunday Morning as the main influence and inspiration for these stories, and many of the lyrics were inspired by the kitchen sink dramas that fuelled the British New Wave of cinema in the late 1950s and early 1960s, such as the film adaptation of Saturday Night and Sunday Morning as well as other classics such as A Taste of Honey, Room at the Top and A Kind of Loving.

A booklet called The Franco Files was made available on the band's merchandise site and also at gigs, featuring six short stories - five of which were written alongside the album in late 2010. The booklet is dedicated to Stan Barstow who died a day before the album's release and also attended school in Ossett (Abbott's home town).
