= Another City, Another Sorry =

Studio album by The Answering Machine
- Released: 15 June 2009
- Genre: Indie rock
- Label: Heist or Hit Records
- Producer: Dave Eringa

The Answering Machine chronology
Another City, Another Sorry (2009)	Lifeline (2011)

Singles from Another City, Another Sorry
- 1. "Cliffer" Released: 3 March 2009; 2. "Obviously Cold" Released: 1 June 2009; 3. "Oklahoma" Released: 10 August 2009; 4. "Emergency/It's Over! It's Over! It's Over!" Released: 23 November 2009

Another City, Another Sorry is the debut studio album by Manchester band The Answering Machine. It was released on 15 June 2009 in the United Kingdom on Heist or Hit Records.

== Track listing ==
No.	Title	Length
1.	"Another City, Another Sorry"	2:28
2.	"Obviously Cold"	3:08
3.	"Oh, Christina"	2:53
4.	"Tomorrow"	3:07
5.	"Cliffer"	3:44
6.	"Emergency"	4:36
7.	"Oklahoma"	2:34
8.	"Lightbulbs"	3:42
9.	"It's Over! It's Over! It's Over!"	2:55
10.	"The Information"	3:18
11.	"You Should Have Called"	4:03

== Personnel ==
- Design - Sean Mort
- Management - Amul Batra
- Mastered by - Ed Woods
- Performer - Ben Perry, Gemma Evans, Martin Colclough, Patrick Fogarty
- Photography - Nicola Chipman
- Photography [Band Shots] - Emily Dennison
- Producer, mixed by, engineer - Dave Eringa
- Producer, mixed by, assistant engineers - Donald Clark, Tom Loffman
- Songwriters - The Answering Machine

== Notes ==
- Produced, mixed and engineered at Warren House Farm Studios and Beethoven Street Studios, London
- Mastered at Black Dog Studios
- Management at Fwinki Music
