= Chasing After Ghosts =

Studio album by The Crookes
- Released: March 28, 2011
- Genre: Indie pop
- Length: 43:19
- Label: Fierce Panda
- Producer: Matt Peel

The Crookes chronology
Chasing After Ghosts	Hold Fast

Singles from Chasing After Ghosts
- 1. "Bloodshot Days" Released: April 5, 2010; 2. "Godless Girl" Released: March 14, 2011; 3. "Chorus of Fools" Released: July 18, 2011; 4. "I Remember Moonlight" Released: October 10, 2011

Chasing After Ghosts was the first full-length studio album released by Sheffield based indie pop group The Crookes. Produced by Matt Peel, the album was released by Fierce Panda Records on 28 March 2011. The album was supported by the release of four singles and received generally positive reviews in the media. Chasing After Ghosts marked the last recording involvement with the Crookes for founding member and guitarist Alex Saunders.

== Background ==
The Crookes were formed in the similarly named suburb of Sheffield in 2008, and had come to initial prominence through releasing one–off singles on Too Pure and Heist or Hit Records before signing with Fierce Panda. After the release of the eight–track Dreams of Another Day EP in October of that year, they recorded their first full-length album, Chasing after Ghosts for release in 2011. This would mark the final contributions of guitarist Alex Saunders, who left the band following the promotional activities surrounding the album.

== Release ==
Chasing after Ghosts was preceded by a single "Godless Girl" in mid–March 2011, two weeks before the release of the album. The song "Bloodshot Days" had been released as a one-shot single the previous year, but this was re–recorded for the album. "Chasing After Ghosts" was released on 28 March 2011, and the band embarked on various promotional tours both in the UK and other territories throughout the rest of the Summer and into Autumn 2011. Two further singles were released to promote the album: "Chorus of Fools" in July, and "I Remember Moonlight" in October 2011. The album itself was subsequently released in Japan in a deluxe version, including four extra tracks unavailable on the UK pressing.

== Track listing ==
All lyrics are written by Daniel Hopewell; all music is composed by The Crookes.

No.	Title	Length
1.	"Godless Girl"	3.42
2.	"Chorus of Fools"	3.13
3.	"Just Like Dreamers"	3.06
4.	"Bright Young Things"	2.49
5.	"The Crookes Laundry Murder, 1922"	4.57
6.	"Youth"	5.08
7.	"I Remember Moonlight"	4.09
8.	"Bloodshot Days"	3.46
9.	"Carnabetian Charms"	2.48
10.	"By the Seine"	3.59
11.	"City of Lights"	5.42
Total length:		43.19

Extra track on the 'Bonus Version' (digital download)
No.	Title	Length
1.	"Godless Girl (Andy H remix)"	4.58

Extra tracks on the Japanese edition
No.	Title	Length
1.	"Tell England"
2.	"Chandelier Girls"
3.	"Farewell to Charms"
4.	"Through the Cats Whisker"

== Reception ==
Professional ratings
Review scores
Source	Rating
AllMusic	3.5/5 stars
BBC	positive
Drowned in Sound	7/10 stars
The Steel Press	7/10 stars
This Is Fake DIY	7/10 stars

Chasing After Ghosts was generally well received by online music press that reviewed it and was supported by both Huw Stephens on BBC Radio 1 and Steve Lamacq on BBC Radio 6 Music. In reviewing the album for the BBC, Iain Moffatt opined that "...live they positively crackle with the sort of inclusively bonhomous pop charge that modern thinking seldom credits currently-little-league guitar bands with, but they've also managed to make a debut album that accommodates all the allusions that come with such a soubriquet." Likening them to Morrissey, The Housemartins and Aztec Camera, he concluded that "...they're admittedly unlikely to shepherd in a fresh wave of post-Britpop, but at least The Crookes are stealing from all the right places." Writing for Drowned in Sound, Robert Cooke similarly likened The Crookes sound to that of The Smiths, but suggested that the album was "...eloquently coherent, with themes of youthful frustration and heartache constantly present, but never in a way that is embarrassingly gushing or childishly simplistic." He concluded that "...it's nice to know that there's a place for poetry in contemporary pop."

AllMusic identified wider influences in the song-writing, with James Allen suggesting that alongside The Smiths, Chasing After Ghosts echoed the likes of The Mighty Lemon Drops, The Woodentops and even The Kinks. Concluding that "... when a band shows this much skill so early on, the biggest worry is that it'll peak too early, but still, there are far less enviable situations for a young act to find itself in," he felt The Crookes sounded "...strikingly self-assured and fully formed for a band making its full-length debut." In her review for This Is Fake DIY, Mary Chang said the album "shows their penchant for jangly guitars and concern for the downhearted, set to a enjoyable soundtrack celebrating the beauty of the shadows" and "Despite their youth and relative lack of life experience, the Crookes have managed to write an album that distills the Northern rain into 11 tracks. Sometimes you need an album that makes you press the Pause button on life, to appreciate what has come before, in simpler terms. 'Chasing After Ghosts' is that kind of album."

== Personnel ==
- Russell Bates (drums)
- Daniel Hopewell (guitar)
- Alex Saunders (guitar)
- George Waite (vocals, bass guitar)
