= Eades =

Eades may refer to:

- 6191 Eades, main-belt asteroid
- Eades, Ontario, Canada
- Eades (surname)
- Michael Eades Reserve, Australia
