= High Hazels =

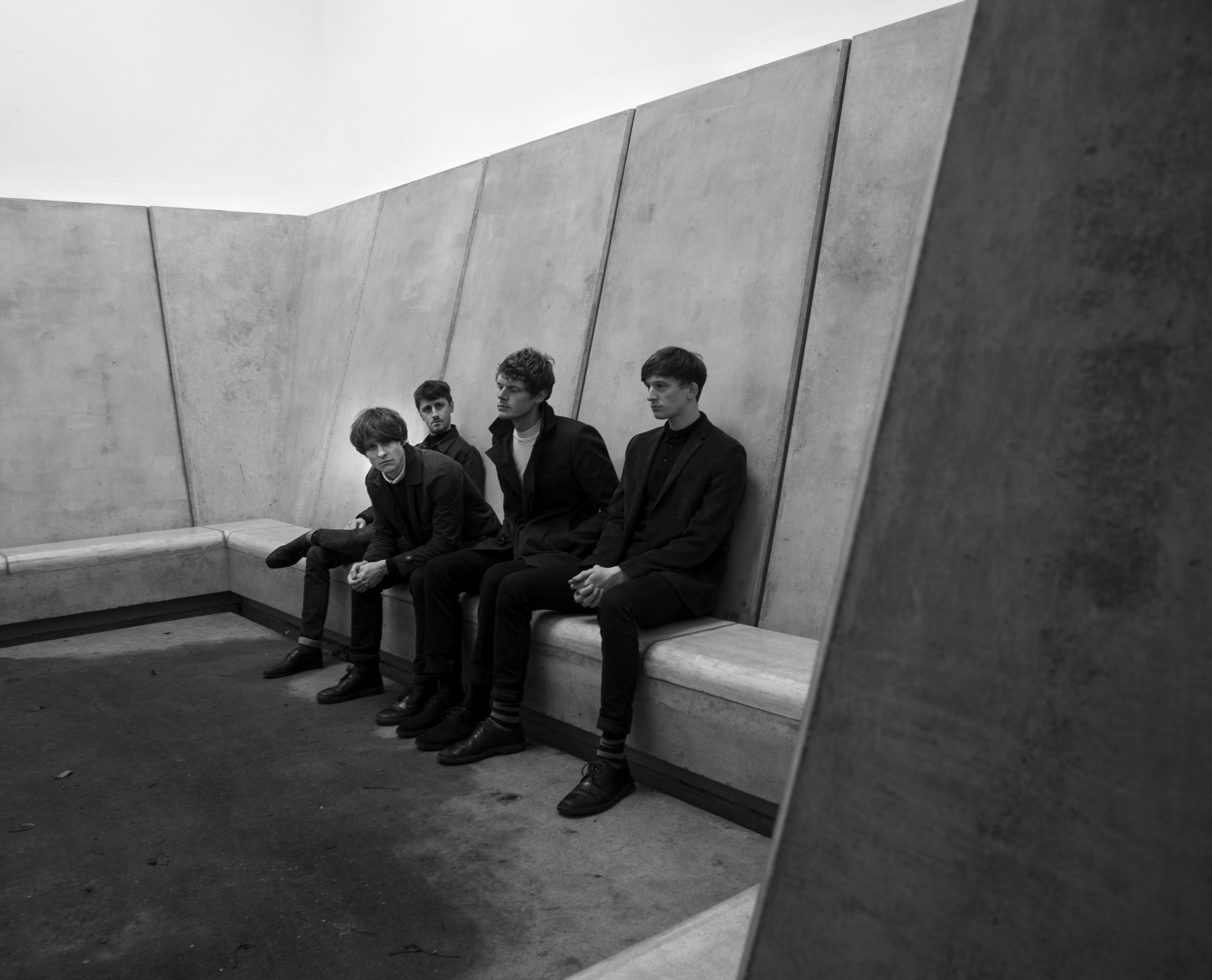
- High Hazels: Scott Howes, James Leesley, Paul Musgrave, and Anthony Barlow, pictured in December 2017

Background information
- Genres: Dream pop
- Years active: 2012–present
- Labels: Heist Or Hit Records
- Members: James Leesley; Scott Howes; Paul Musgrave; Anthony Barlow
- Past members: Paul Barlow (2012–2017)
- Website: highhazels.tumblr.com

High Hazels are an English band made up of singer and guitarist James Leesley, lead guitarist Scott Howes, Anthony Barlow (drums) and Paul Musgrave (b.vox / bass guitar). The band hail from Handsworth, a suburb of Sheffield where three of the members (James, Scott and Anthony) became friends in primary school and then later bonded over their shared passion for music.

James, Scott and Anthony played together in bands after leaving school for a while before deciding to concentrate on writing. Paul also played in various other outfits before joining the band. The band rehearse in the city's industrial area, Kelham Island in an industrial workspace in a former factory overlooking the River Don.

The band recorded their first songs in October 2012 and sent the results to BBC Radio and 6 Music DJ, Steve Lamacq. Lamacq then played one of the songs on his daily 6 Music show and then on his Radio 2 show before the band had played a gig.

Their first gig was on 30 November 2012 at The Great Gatsby Bar in Sheffield.

In October 2013 the band signed a deal with Heist Or Hit Records to release their debut single, Hearts Are Breaking on limited edition 7 inch vinyl. The band played a sold out single launch at The Harley in Sheffield to mark its release.

Clash Music said of the band, "All lilting songwriting and stark directness, it's a vision of fluorescent lights reflected in a puddle of rain water." Guardian Music went on to say, "If you’re a fan of The Smiths, or The Coral at their most melodic, then this may be right up your street."

The band are influenced by artists such as Simon & Garfunkel, Elbow, Fleet Foxes, The Smiths, Radiohead, The Shins, The Walkmen, John Cooper Clarke, and Joy Division, among others.

In February 2014, the band announced via their website that they were releasing a four track EP, In The Half Light. The EP was released on 10-inch vinyl and digital download via Heist Or Hit Records on 7 April 2014. In July 2014 to coincide with their main stage performance at Tramlines Festival, the band announced the release of a single from their debut album.

On 24 July 2014, the band's 'Misbehave' single was reviewed by Rob da Bank, Liam Fray of The Courteeners and Eve Barlow from NME on Steve Lamacq's Round Table radio show on BBC 6 Music.

== Early history (2009–2011) ==
Between 2009 and 2011, Paperdots formed by James Leesley, Scott Hawes, Anthony Barlow and Jonathan Birch as a four piece guitar band. Their music is melodic and tuneful taking influence from the likes of Bowie, The Beatles, Pulp, The Shins and The Strokes. They released several works online as well as actively involved in live performance and music festivals around South Yorkshire. In late 2009, they touring with The Saw Doctors as support band. The band agreed not to continue under the Paperdots name when Jonathan decided to leave. There was short period of transition for the band called "Sunday Town", formed by the rest of members when they got back to studio and recorded several demos together. Some of them then come into the first EP of High Hazels: In the Half Light. In 2012, Paul Barlow-elder brother of Drummer Anthony brings new life to the band when he finally decide to join in as bass guitar.

== Discography ==
=== Albums ===
- High Hazels (Heist or Hit Records) - 27 October 2014

=== EPs ===
- In The Half Light (Heist Or Hit Records) - 7 April 2014
- Weak Sun EP (Heist Or Hit Records) - 17 February 2017

=== Singles ===
- "Hearts Are Breaking" (Heist Or Hit Records) - 7 October 2013
- "Misbehave" (Heist Or Hit Records) - 15 September 2014
- "VALENCIA" (Heist Or Hit Records) - 27 April 2015
- "Joined At The Lip" - 21 November 2016
