= I Love You Will U Marry Me =

Graffiti message in Sheffield, England

Coordinates: 53.3804°N 1.4593°W

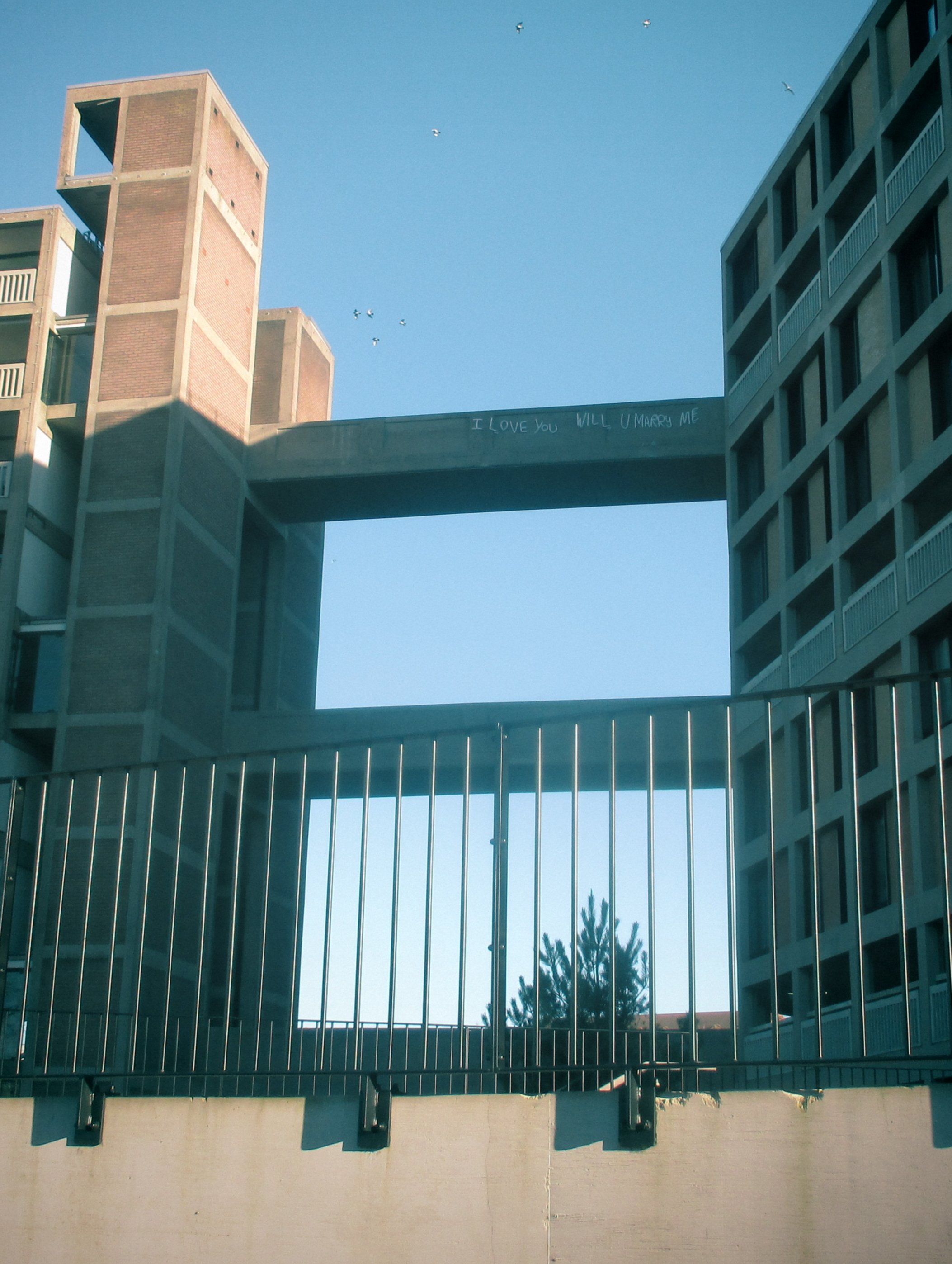
The Park Hill estate in 2022, after the graffiti had been reinstated on the top bridge with neon lettering

I Love You Will U Marry Me was a message added as graffiti to a high concrete bridge at the Park Hill housing estate in Sheffield in April 2001, after the estate was listed at Grade II in 1998 and before a full refurbishment of the estate began in 2006. Having become a well known and liked feature of the estate, the graffiti was retained in the refurbishment and, in 2011, enhanced with the addition of pink neon lighting that picked out the letters over the white paint. The neon signage and underlying graffiti were removed due to maintenance work in 2021, but reinstated in 2022.

== History ==
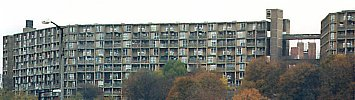
Distant view of the Park Hill estate in 2003, with the "I Love You" bridge to the top right

The words were written quickly with white paint, 130 ft (40 m) in the air, on the side of a bridge crossing over Norwich Street from one block of flats to another at the 13th floor level on the estate. The message was addressed to Clare Middleton, the girlfriend of a young man, Jason Lowe, so he could show her his very public declaration of love and marriage proposal from afar after an outing to a cinema. Clare accepted Jason's proposal, but the pair were never wed, and Clare later married someone else; she died of cancer in 2007, aged 30. The white message remained in place, visible for miles across the city.

External videos
- "The Graffiti that Changed a City" at YouTube, by Britmonkey, 1 March, 2021

The slogan was adopted by Urban Splash after they were awarded the project to renovate the dilapidated estate from 2006, omitting the name of its addressee and (at that time) without knowing its provenance. The backstory and the original artist were only rediscovered after a BBC Radio 4 documentary first broadcast in 2011.

Both the paint and the neon sign were removed during maintenance in 2021 to widespread consternation, but on 13 June 2022, the graffiti was added back to the building, and the next day, the new neon lighting was added on top of it. In 2024, a plaque was installed on Pat Midgley Lane dedicated to Clare's memory.

== Cultural impact ==
The slogan was included on a replica of the bridge exhibited by architect Jeremy Till in the British Pavilion at the Venice Biennale of Architecture in 2006. It was added to promotional T-shirts printed for Urban Splash, one of which was worn on stage by Alex Turner of the Arctic Monkeys. It was also added to the developer's sale brochures and on cushions in show flats. As the paint faded, Urban Splash commissioned a neon sign in 2011 that was installed on the bridge directly over the words to make them permanent and visible at night, taking inspiration from the neon sign light artworks of Tracey Emin.

The Thornbridge Brewery made an "I Love You Will U Marry Me" strawberry blonde ale, bottles of which were presented to buyers of flats. It was the inspiration for several musicians, including a 2012 song "The I Love You bridge" by The Crookes and a 2017 song "I Love You, Will You Marry Me" by Yungblud.

The slogan is included in the set of the musical Standing at the Sky's Edge, which is set at the Park Hill estate, and is alluded to by the characters.
