= Tear Ourselves Away =

Studio album by LoveLikeFire
- Released: August 10, 2009
- Genre: Indie rock

LoveLikeFire chronology
An Ocean in the Air	Tear Ourselves Away

Tear Ourselves Away is the first full-length LP by San Francisco-based indie rock band LoveLikeFire. The album was released commercially on August 10, 2009. A leaked version of the album first appeared on the internet in April 2009.

== Track listing ==
The track listing is as follows:

1. "William"
2. "From a Tower"
3. "Crows Feet"
4. "Signs"
5. "I've Pissed Off My Friends"
6. "Good Judgment"
7. "Boredom"
8. "My Left Eye"
9. "Far From Home"
10. "Stand in Your Shoes"
11. "Everything Must Settle"
