= Dinowalrus =

US musical group

- Origin: Brooklyn, New York, U.S.
- Genres: psychedelic rock, experimental rock, post-punk revival
- Years active: 2007–present
- Labels: Kanine Records, Old Flame Records, Heist Or Hit Records, EXO, Moorworks
- Members: Pete Feigenbaum; Pete Sustarsic; Sam Bloch; Meaghan Omega
- Past members: Dan Peskin; Liam Andrew; Max Tucker; Tyler McCauley; Josh Da Costa; John Atkinson; Kyle Warren; Anton Hochheim; Christopher Weingarten; Andy Bond; Etienne DuGuay
- Website: www.dinowalrus.com/

Dinowalrus is an American band from Brooklyn, New York, formed by Titus Andronicus guitarist Peter Feigenbaum. The band have released four albums and toured internationally.

== History ==
The group was formed in 2007 by vocalist/guitarist Pete Feigenbaum and synthesizer/bass/clarinet/guitar player Kyle Warren. After working on a batch of loose krautrock-inspired improv pieces with a rotating cast of drummers including Andy Bond (aka Oliver Duncan, who would later join Friends) and Etienne DuGuay (who would later join Real Estate (band)), Feigenbaum and Warren began settled down with 18-year-old Belgian drummer Josh Da Costa and began writing and recording the album that would become % (pronounced "percent") throughout 2008, while playing gigs regularly around New York with the likes of Titus Andronicus, Parts & Labor, Aa (Big A Little a), A Place to Bury Strangers, DD/MM/YYYY and Grooms.

In late 2008 they released their first 7". "Electric Car Gas Guitar" b/w "Cage Those Pythons". It was distributed via the labels Impose and RVNG. A second 7" followed in February 2009: a split with Bachelor of Arts from Melbourne, Australia on the label EXO.

Dinowalrus signed a one-album deal with Kanine Records in June 2009 to release their debut album %. Meanwhile, Feigenbaum also began touring and recording as a guitarist in Titus Andronicus for the 2nd half of 2009 while production on % finished up.

%, a sprawling and experimental debut, was released in January 2010. The album received reviews from Tiny Mix Tapes, Consequence of Sound, Pitchfork Magazine and PopMatters. Mini-tours with among other Fang Island, followed during the first half of 2010.

Significant lineup changes occurred in the summer 2010 as Dinowalrus began to write their 2nd album. Warren was replaced by Liam Andrew on synthesizers and bass. A new single, "Phone Home from the Edge", originally written in February 2009, was premiered on Stereogum in fall 2010, and subsequently received positive attention from the NME blog, and airplay on the BBC 6 Music show of Lauren Laverne. The band later made a video for this song, which starred Toxic Avenger creator Lloyd Kaufman.

Former The Depreciation Guild drummer Anton Hochheim was brought in during the fall and winter of 2010 for studio sessions. Drummer Max Tucker, formerly of Francis and the Lights and Patrick Cleandenim, joined full-time in March 2011.

Their second album, entitled Best Behavior, was released in March 2012 on Old Flame Records, garnering positive reviews from Pitchfork, NME, No Ripcord, and Consequence of Sound. In February 2012, the band signed with Heist or Hit Records for release of their second album in Europe

In 2013, the band returned to the studio to work on their 3rd album, Complexion, which was mixed by Jorge Elbrecht of Violens, also a touring member of Ariel Pink's Haunted Graffiti. They released a single entitled "Grounded", and an accompanying video, on Pitchfork and Stereogum. They released Complexion in April 2014 via Personal Projects, part of the Frenchkiss Label Group. John Atkinson from Aa_(Big_A_Little_a) also began making appearances on backing vocal and percussion duties. Liam Andrew left the band in 2015 to move to Austin, Texas; and was replaced by Meaghan Omega on bass and backing vocals, and Dan Peskin on synthesizers.

The core of Feigenbaum, Peskin and Omega delivered a shoegaze and britpop-inspired 4th album entitled Fairweather in 2016, it was also released in Japan by Moorworks, the band's first Japanese release.

== Discography ==
=== Albums ===
- Fairweather (Moorworks/Personal Projects, September 2016)
- Complexion (Personal Projects, June 2014)
- Best Behavior (Old Flame/Heist or Hit Records, March 2012)
- % (Kanine Records, January 2010)

=== 7" Singles ===
- "BEAD" (Split with Bachelor of Arts, EXO Records, February 2009)
- "Electric Car Gas Guitar/Cage Those Pythons" (Impose Records, December 2008)
