= Bed of Gold =

EP by LoveLikeFire
- Released: August 15, 2006
- Recorded: 2006
- Genre: Indie rock
- Length: 25:37
- Label: Black Ludella Publishing

LoveLikeFire chronology
| Bed of Gold (2006) | An Ocean in the Air (2007) |

Bed of Gold is the debut EP of San Francisco-based indie rock band LoveLikeFire. It was released in 2006, the same year that the band formed. The album received critical praise from The A.V. Club, LA Weekly, and the East Bay Express.

== Track listing ==
1. "Inner Space" – 2:29
2. "A Million Pieces" – 4:10
3. "Radio Nurse" – 5:03
4. "You're Never Alone" – 4:38
5. "Bullet Proof" – 3:10
6. "Delusion" – 6:07
