= An Ocean in the Air =

EP by LoveLikeFire
- Released: August 28, 2007
- Genre: Indie rock
- Length: 27:44

LoveLikeFire chronology
Bed of Gold (2006)	An Ocean in the Air (2007)	Tear Ourselves Away (2009)

An Ocean in the Air is the second EP of San Francisco-based indie rock band LoveLikeFire. It was released in 2007. The album received critical praise from Spin magazine.

The music video for the song "I Will" was chosen as an Official Selection of SXSW 2008 Film Festival. The video was shot on 16 mm film and is "carnival-themed".

== Track listing ==
1. "Unlighted Shadow" – 3:03
2. "From a Tower" – 4:21
3. "Broken Shapes" – 4:21
4. "S.O.S." – 3:48
5. "Skin & Bones" – 4:36
6. "Wish You Dead" – 3:48
7. "I Will" – 3:47
