= Rapids! =

English indie rock band

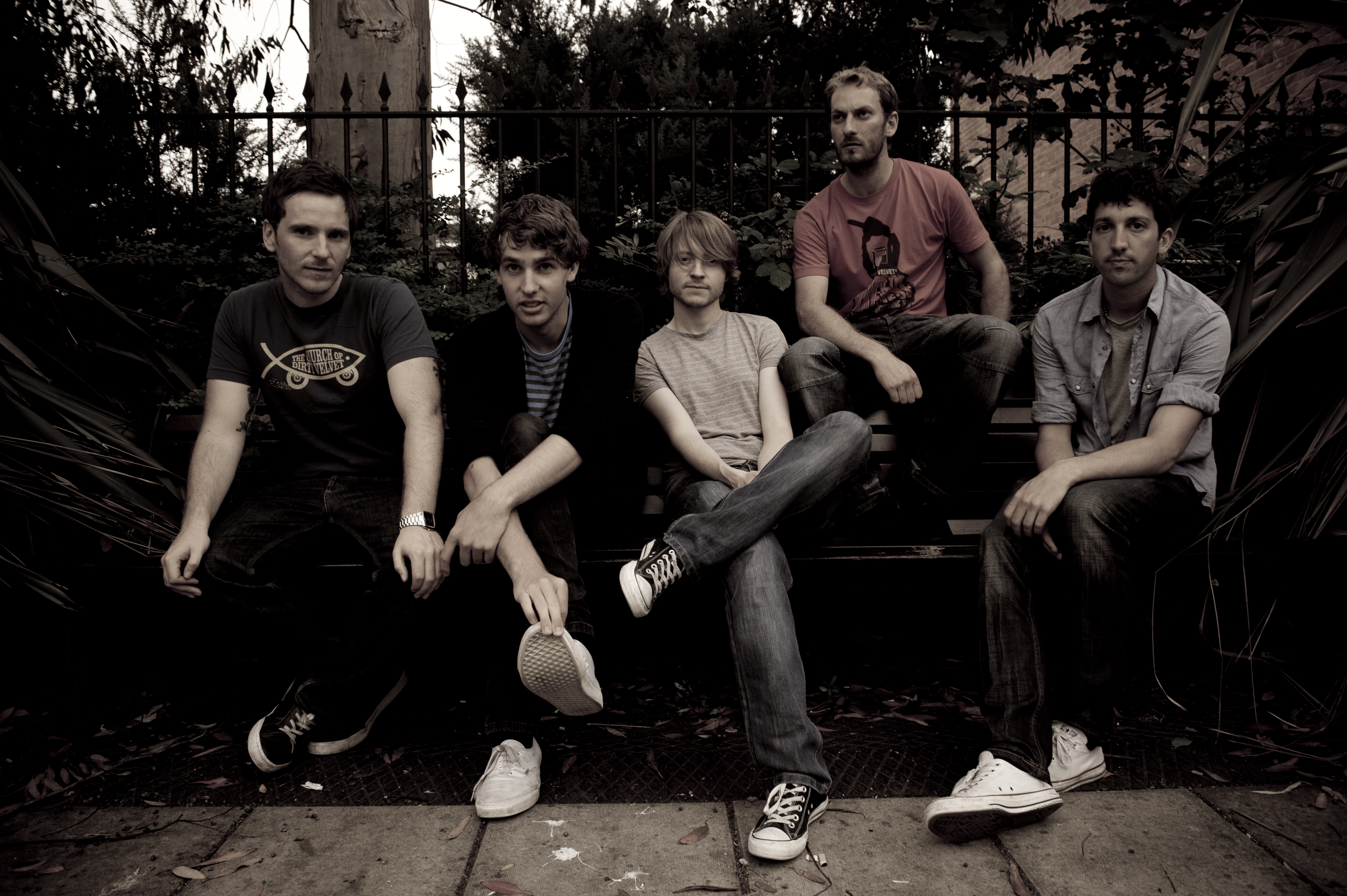
- Rapids!

Background information
- Origin: Bournemouth, England, UK
- Genre: Indie rock
- Years active: 2009–2012
- Label: Heist Or Hit Records
- Past members: Matt Holliday (vocals, sampler, synth); James Davies (drums); Rob Murray (guitar); Steve DaCosta (guitar); Tim Richards (bass, guitar)
- Website: Myspace.com

Rapids! were an English indie rock band from Bournemouth, England, which formed in August 2009.

== Career ==
Rapids! held their debut gig in a small bar in Bournemouth in October 2009. They released their first three track, self-titled EP in November 2009, limited to 200 copies and containing their earliest songs: "Maps", "Void" and "The Elitist". Following further time in the studio, they released a six track EP in March 2010, building on their first three tracks with the songs "Fuses", "Economics" and "Inland Empire".

Between October 2009 and early 2010, Rapids! played a large number of shows across the south coast of England, gaining favourable reviews in Artrocker and Rocksound, as well as having airplay on John Kennedy's XFM show. The band signed to the London-based record label, Heist Or Hit Records, in July 2009.

In summer 2010, a year after forming, Rapids! built on the earlier XFM radio play with the track "Fuses" being played by Tom Robinson. Steve Lamacq invited the band on to his show for a live interview and radio play. In September 2010, Rapids! played a live session for BBC Introducing on BBC 6 Music.

The Rapids! song, "Fuses", was played as a soundtrack to the weekly goals round up on Sky One's Soccer AM television programme in October 2010. A UK tour took place in late 2010, and the band were invited to showcase at in the City festival in October.

The band released their double A side single 'Comets' and 'House of Sand And Fog on 11 July 2011 taken from their second release Fragments EP (released on 15 August 2011 via Heist Or Hit Records). The track 'Nameless/Faceless' from the Fragments EP was remixed by Russell Lissack of Bloc Party and was one of NME's free downloads.

In a note on the band's Facebook page on 10 July 2012 they announced that the band have split up.
