= Simian Ghost =

Swedish musical group

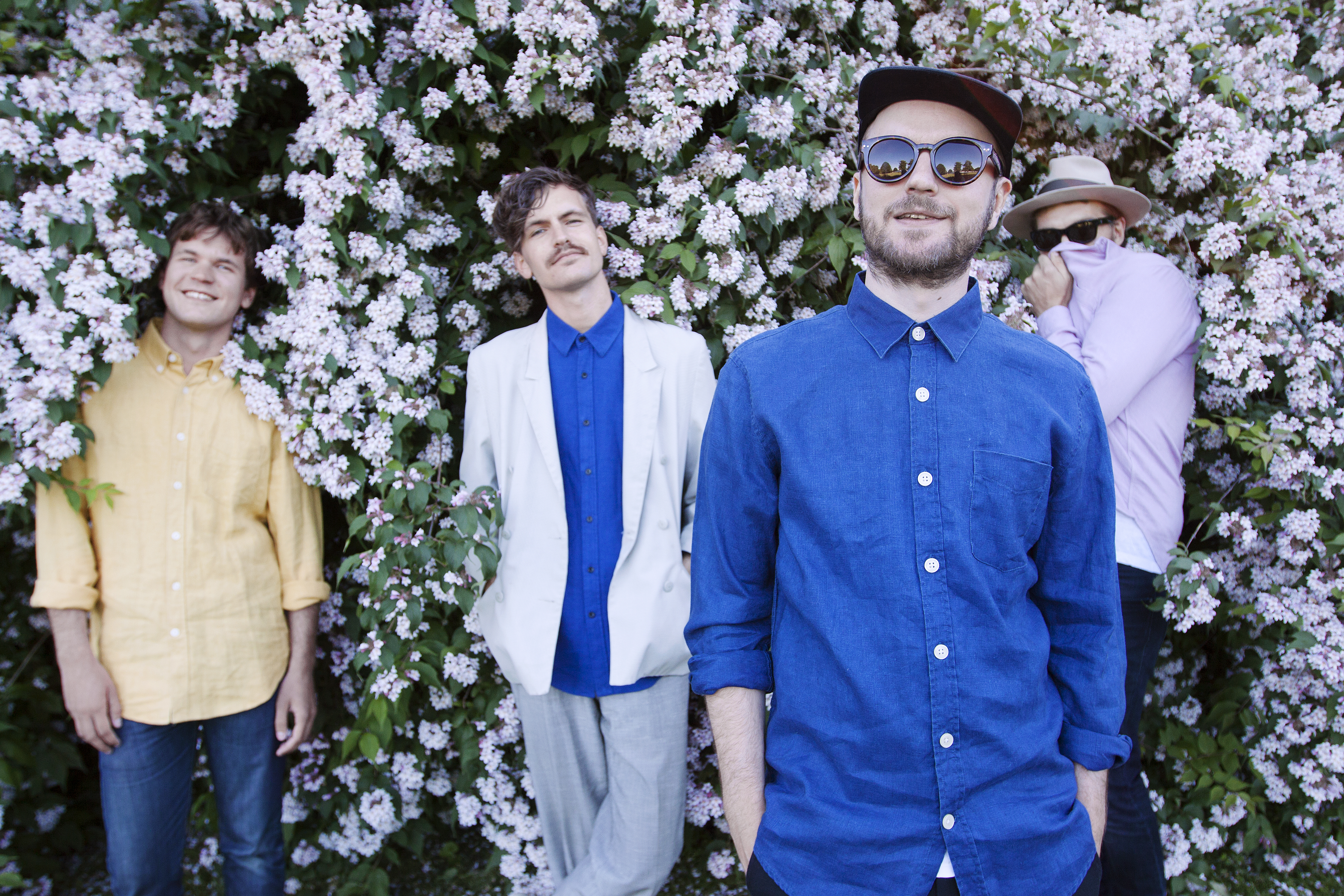
- Simian Ghost in 2017

Background information
- Origin: Sandviken, Sweden
- Genres: Alternative; indie; shoegaze; chillwave
- Years active: 2010–present
- Labels: Playground Music; Nomethod Records; Flake Records; Heist or Hit Records (UK)
- Members: Sebastian Arnström; Erik Klinga; Mathias Zachrisson; Wilhelm Magnusson
- Website: simianghost.com

Simian Ghost is an alternative music group from Sandviken/Gävle, Sweden, consisting of Sebastian Arnström, Erik Klinga, Mathias Zachrisson and Wilhelm Magnusson. It was initiated as a recording project by Sebastian Arnström. He released one full-length album, Infinite Traffic Everywhere, which was received with blog praise and excellent reviews. It topped the critics chart in Sweden and was voted record of the year by the readers at Dagensskiva.se. Six months after the release of said record he released a 7-song EP called Lovelorn.

Since their 2011 debut they have already shared stages with among others Mount Kimbie, SBTRKT, Niki & The Dove and Active Child.

Simian Ghost released their second full-length album written by all three members of the band; Youth in early 2012 and it was met once again with great reviews. As the first Swedish act since ABBA they got a lead review in The Times and The Guardian called it "an early contender for the album of the year".

In 2012 the band first visited the UK for several live dates also included a live session with Lauren Laverne on BBC Radio 2 and also on Laverne's show on BBC6Music with Nemone sitting in.

In May 2012, the band played the Camden Crawl festival, appearing at Electric Ballroom and also at The Great Escape Festival in Brighton. The band's first major tour of the UK was in June 2012 as part of the first The Line Of Best Fit tour.

In late 2013, the band released some new tracks to fans in advance of the release of their 3rd album, “The Veil” in 2014. In 2014, the band showcased at SXSW and at CMJ prior to releasing their double vinyl album, “The Veil” released worldwide via Playground Music Scandinavia, Discograph, France and Studio !K7.

In late 2015, the band started work on their eponymous 4th album. Made in collaboration with Thomas Hedlund of Phoenix (band) and Umeå based producer Henrik Oja, this album is the band's first partly recorded in a studio setting.

== Discography ==
=== Albums ===
- Infinite Traffic Everywhere (2011)
- Youth (2012)
- The Veil (2014)
- Simian Ghost (2017)

=== EPs ===
- Lovelorn (2011)
- Autumn Slowmo (For the Dejected Realist) (2012)

=== Singles ===
- "Transparent Is OK" (2010)
- "Bicycle Theme" (2011)
- "Wolf Girl" (2011)
- "Curtain Call" (2012)
- "Automation" (2012)
- "Be My Wife" (2013)
- "A Million Shining Colours" (2013)
- "Echoes of Songs (for Trish Keenan)" (2014)
- "Fun" (2016)
- "Stop Moving" (2017)
- "When You're Ready" (2017)
- "Last Night" (2017)
