= First Love, Last Rites (musical group) =

- Also known as: FLLR
- Origin: Umeå, Sweden
- Genres: Indiepop and Shoegaze
- Years active: 2009-
- Labels: Heist or Hit Records(UK), Nomethod Records(Scandinavia), Afterhours Records(Japan)
- Members: Hörnan; Berra; VA; Danne
- Website: www.firstlovelastrites.com

First Love, Last Rites (FLLR) is an indie pop-/rock band formed in Umeå, Sweden in 2009. The band is signed to the labels Heist or Hit records (UK), Nomethod records (Scandinavia), and Afterhours Records (Japan).

First Love, Last Rites released their debut single Slow Wind. on 13 September 2010. It rapidly created a buzz in the Scandinavian blogosphere. Tram7 was one of the music blogs that wrote about the single. The band went on to record the rest of their debut album, which included layers and layers of guitar tracks; vocals were put in the back of the mix. The band released a second single-"I'm gone"- on 24 December, just before the self-titled debut album "First Love, Last Rites" appeared on 5 January 2011. When describing the album, Swedish entertainment monthlies Nöjesguiden and Gaffa referenced youth, decadence and broken hearts, while Sundsvalls Tidning called it "a massive phase error".

During the winter and spring of 2011–2012, First Love, Last Rites recorded the follow-up album "Wasted hearts" and released the single "Walk you home." The media coverage in Sweden included rotation on indie radio station Gimme indie, as well as in England on the blog Jajajamusic. The single from the album, "Charlot", was released in 2012. The accompanying music video premiered on PSL, a music blog hosted by the Swedish public television company SVT on 12 November.

"Wasted hearts" was reviewed in Sweden's largest morning newspaper Dagens Nyheter on December 5. The reviewer stated, "Wasted Hearts sounds great. Rather wonderful, actually. Best track:" Walk you home '".

The band signed to Heist Or Hit Records on 8 March 2013.

== Discography ==
- 2010 Slow Wind – Digital single (Nomethod)
- 2010 I'm Gone – Digital single (Nomethod)
- 2011 First love, last rites – LP (Nomethod/Border)
- 2012 Walk you home – Digital single (Nomethod)
- 2012 Charlot – Digital single (Nomethod)
- 2012 Wasted Hearts – Digital/LP/CD (Nomethod/Playground)
- 2013 Young Girl – Digital single (Nomethod)
