= The Answering Machine =

British indie band from Manchester

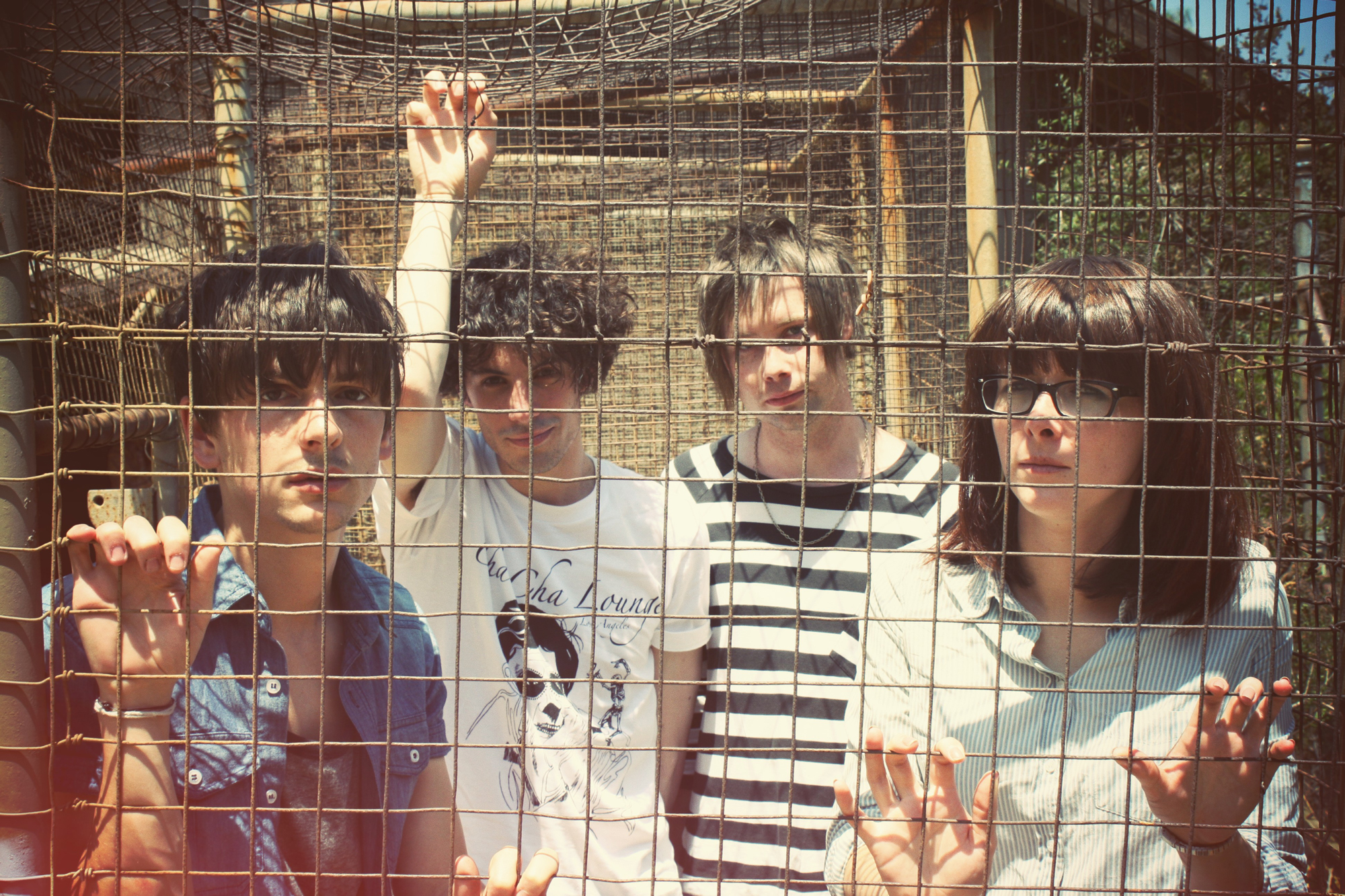

Background information
- Origin: Manchester, England, UK
- Genres: Indie rock
- Years active: 2005–2011
- Labels: Heist or Hit Records 2008–2011; Fastcut Records, Japan 2011; Universal Publishing 2006–2009 (publishing)
- Members: Martin Colclough; Pat Fogarty; Gemma Oakes, née Evans; Ben Perry
- Website: Official Website (defunct)

The Answering Machine were an indie rock band based in Manchester, England.

== Biography ==
The band formed in October 2005 at the University of Manchester. Martin Colclough and Pat Fogarty wrote songs together in their final year at university, and Gemma Evans joined on bass shortly afterwards. Their first gig was at Retro Bar in Manchester on 1 March 2006. The band played as a three-piece (Colclough, Fogarty, and Evans) until August 2007. Until this point they used a drum machine called Mustafa Beat.

The Answering Machine released their first single, "Oklahoma" on 16 October 2006 through High Voltage Sounds. The single was limited to 500 vinyl copies, and sold out in two days. Second Single, "Silent Hotels" was released with High Voltage Sounds on 18 June 2007. The single was again limited to 500 vinyl copies. They released their third single, "Lightbulbs" on 5 November 2007 with Regal Records. The band released their single "Cliffer" in March 2009 with Heist or Hit Records.

The band played at Glastonbury festival 2007 and SXSW festival 2008 and again in 2011. They have performed a UK headline tour in May/June 2007, and a support tour with The Rumble Strips in October/November 2007. In April 2009, the band toured in the USA playing at the Viper Room and the Mercury Lounge in New York. In May 2009 the band toured extensively throughout the UK firstly with Twisted Wheel and later in the same month a major venue tour with Manic Street Preachers. In October 2009, the band visited the US again to perform at CMJ Music Marathon and a month's residency at CoCo66 in Greenpoint, NY. In December 2009, the band played at British Anthems festival in Japan.

The Answering Machine completed recording their debut album produced by Dave Eringa at Warren House Farm Studios in Yorkshire and mixed at Beethoven Street Studios, London. The debut album Another City, Another Sorry was released on 15 June 2009.

Their song "It's Over! It's Over! It's Over!" is featured on the video game FIFA 10. The band also had two songs featured on the BBC TV show Gavin & Stacey during the second episode of the third series.

The Answering Machine announced they were disbanding on 16 May 2011.. Two members of the band, Martin Colclough and Pat Fogarty went on to run the Manchester independent label Heist or Hit Records.

== Trivia ==
- The Answering Machine performed an acoustic version of "Obviously Cold" at BETA Records TV Studios in Hollywood, California in early 2009. The acoustic song segment was taken in June 2009 for the BETA Records Music TV Series, directed by Eric MacIver and produced by Chris Honetschlaeger.

== Members ==
- Martin Colclough - Vocals, Guitar
- Pat Fogarty - Guitar, Backing Vocals
- Gemma Oakes, née Evans - Bass, Backing Vocals
- Ben Perry - Drums
- Luke Bellis - Guitar, Keys, Backing Vocals

== Discography ==
=== Studio albums ===
- Another City, Another Sorry (Heist or Hit Records) - 2009
- Lifeline (Heist or Hit Records) - 2011

=== Singles ===
- "Oklahoma" (High Voltage Sounds) - 16 October 2006
- "Silent Hotels" (High Voltage Sounds) - 18 June 2007
- "Lightbulbs" (Regal Records) - 5 November 2007
- "Cliffer" (Heist or Hit Records) - 3 March 2009
- "Obviously Cold" (Heist or Hit Records) - 1 June 2009
- "Oklahoma" (Heist or Hit Records) - 10 August 2009
- "It's Over! It's Over! It's Over!" / "Emergency" (Heist or Hit Records) - 23 November 2009
- "Animals" (Heist or Hit Records) - 17 October 2010
- "Lifeline" (Heist or Hit Records) - 14 February 2011
