= Michael Eades Reserve =

Coordinates: 33.686°S 150.318°E

The bushland in Michael Eades Reserve and surrounds is rich in sensitive vegetation, unique to the upper Blue Mountains plateau, in New South Wales, Australia. Many of the significant plants in the area, such as Acacia ptychoclada and Grevillea acanthifolia, do not appear anywhere else in the world.

Canyon Floor of Michael Eades Reserve

== Vegetation ==
Hanging swamps are an interesting feature of the Reserve and are defined not only by the unique plant life - sedges, grasses and shrubs - but also by the underlying geology. Layers of sandstone, claystone and shale direct groundwater to exit points on the valley walls, which feed the swamps on a continuous basis. These hanging swamps are the source of water for creeks and waterfalls in the upper Blue Mountains. In this Reserve, Katoomba Creek flows downstream into the World Heritage Site of the Grose Valley.

Hanging swamps are home to many threatened and endangered animals: Blue Mountains Water Skink, Giant Dragonfly, and the Giant Burrowing Frog.

The natural systems of the area have deep cultural and landscape significant to the local Darug Aboriginal community - past and present and future. The Reserve is still highly valued today by the local community. The bushland and creek systems have inspired many active community volunteers to work on bushland protection and restoration here since 1996. This volunteer work continues in collaboration with Blue Mountains City Council and other land management agencies.

== Name ==
Community efforts to protect bushland in the Blue Mountains were supported by Michael Eades (1954–2002) after whom this Reserve is dedicated. Eades made a major contribution to a heightened awareness and understanding of the special and fragile natural environment of the Blue Mountains, which resulted in the recognition of environmentally sensitive land in Council's Land Environmental Plan 1991. Eades's work has also contributed significantly to the eventual federal government listing at a National level of the Blue Mountains Sedge and Shrub swamps.

Eades was a champion of the need to protect the unique flora of the Mountains and identified a number of endangered plant species. He provided critical advice and support to community volunteer endeavours in bushland protection and the establishment of the council's Bushcare Program.
