= I Am Oak =

Dutch musician

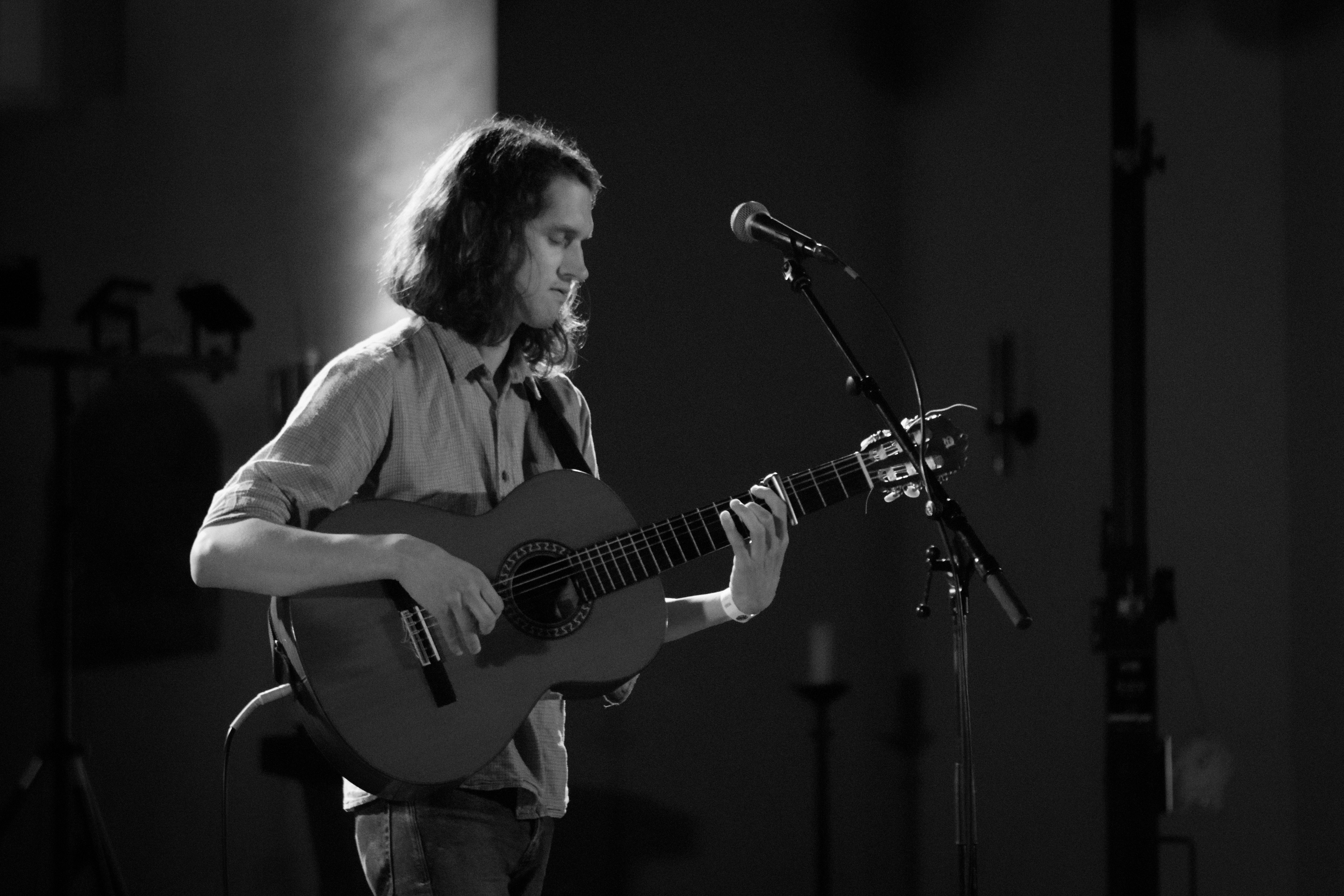
- I Am Oak at Way Back When Festival 2017 in Dortmund.

Background information
- Origin: Utrecht, Netherlands
- Genres: Indie folk, Indie, Ambient
- Instruments: Guitars, Vocals, Bass, Keyboard, Drums
- Labels: Snowstar, Heist Or Hit Records (UK/Ireland)]
- Members: Thijs Kuijken; Stefan Breuer; Tammo Kersbergen; Robby Wouters
- Website: Homepage

I Am Oak is the band of Utrecht-based musician Thijs Kuijken. The band started in 2008. In that year the band released their first EP ‘Sou Ka’. The music of I Am Oak is often described as folk, indie and acoustic.

The first full-length album by the band ‘On Claws’ was released by Snowstar Records in 2010. One year later, in 2011, I Am Oak won the Dutch based 3VOOR12 Award for best album for their 2011 release, Oasem. The band also appeared at the prestigious 2011 Popkomm festival

In March 2012, the band showcased at the South by Southwest Festival in Austin, Texas being described as one of the top artists performing from The Netherlands. In May 2012, I Am Oak performed three shows at The Great Escape Festival in Brighton and were selected by the festival as their Band Of The Day.

2012 saw the release of the band's third full-length album entitled "Nowhere Or Tammensaari" on Snowstar Records in The Netherlands and on Heist Or Hit Records on the 2nd of July in the UK & Ireland. The album was recorded in a house in a small town in Finland, the name of which translates to “oak island.” However, although located in Finland, the majority language there is Swedish, thus the town is also known as Ekenäs, which translates to “oak peninsula."

The first single 'Palpable' from the album “Nowhere Or Tammensaari" has been featured on several occasions on BBC 6 Music on the Lauren Laverne show, first played on 3 May 2012 On 25 June 2012, Lauren Laverne added the single 'Palpable' as her BBC 6 Music 'MPFree' track

31 January 2014 marked the release-date for I am Oak's fourth full-length album. The album, titled 'Ols Songd', is a collection of previously unreleased songs. Most songs on the album have been written a long time ago, some even prior to the debut-album 'On Claws'. Critical reactions to the album have been mostly positive. Several platforms rewarded 'Ols Songd' with a four out of five star rating, praising I am Oak's ability to write touching music that excels in the details. First single 'Honeycomb' is widely claimed to be the strongest song on the record.

Early 2014 saw another release for I am Oak. Singer Thijs Kuijken recorded a split EP together with The Black Atlantic. The cooperation resulted in a 10" vinyl titled 'Black Oak'. The record contains a total of 6 songs, three on each side. Consisting of two songs written together, one new song of either artist and a cover of a song originally written by the other artist. Apart from the 10" vinyl I am Oak & The Black Atlantic recorded a video for the song 'Rove' and did a 'Black Oak' tour through Germany and Switzerland.

== Discography ==
=== Studio albums ===
- Osmosis (2019)
- Our blood (2016)
- Ols Songd (re-recorded) (2013)
- Nowhere Or Tammensaari (2012)
- Oasem (2011)
- On Claws (2010)
- Ols Songd (2008)
- Sou Ka (2008)

=== EPs ===
- Black Oak in cooperation with The Black Atlantic. – 2014
- Waves II – VII – 2011
- Skulk – 2012

=== Singles ===
- "On Trees and Birds and Fire" (2010)
- "Curt" (2011)
- "Palpable" (2012)
- "Reins" (2012)
- "Honeycomb" (2014)

== Prizes ==
Year	Prize	Award	Music
2010	3VOOR12/Utrecht Award	Best Album	I Am Oak – On Claws
2010	3VOOR12/Utrecht Award	Song of the year	I Am Oak – On Trees and Birds and Fire
2011	3VOOR12 Award	Best Album	I Am Oak – Oasem
2011	Radio 3FM	No. 88 song of the year	I Am Oak – Curt
2012	3VOOR12/Utrecht	Song of the year	I Am Oak – Palpable
