= Pyncher =

English alternative rock band

pyncher
- Pyncher during the Sŵn Festival in Cardiff

Background information
- Origin: Manchester, England
- Genres: Alternative rock, post-punk, garage rock
- Years active: 2020-present
- Members: Sam Blakeley; Harvey O'Toole; Britt Dewhurst; Jack Rainbow
- Website: pyncher.bandcamp.com

pyncher are an English alternative rock band, formed in Manchester in 2020. The band is composed of vocalist and guitarist Sam Blakeley, lead guitarist Harvey O'Toole, bassist Britt Dewhurst, and drummer Jack Rainbow. The band has a reputation for their high-energy live shows, called "electrifying" and "one of the city's most talked‑about new acts" by BBC Music Introducing.

== History ==
In early 2020, lead vocalist Sam Blakeley and lead guitarist Harvey O'Toole met while both were studying at university in Manchester, initially bonding over a shared interest in The Beatles. Together, they did covers of Beatles songs before eventually writing their own music, enlisting Britt Dewhurst as bassist and Blakeley's childhood friend from Steyning, Jack Rainbow, as drummer. Around the time they formed, the COVID-19 lockdowns in the United Kingdom began to take effect, throughout which the group wrote and rehearsed music together, but were unable to perform gigs due to lockdown restrictions.

After restrictions were lifted, pyncher played their live Manchester debut at Fuel Cafe Bar in Withington, and continued to frequently play gigs at various locations, including The White Hotel, soon becoming known for their high-energy performances.

== Musical style and influences ==
In terms of musical style, pyncher has been referred to as "genre-blending", and guitarist Harvey O'Toole expressed a preference for being "unlabelled": "We like the idea of people not seeing us as a specific type of band." The Guardian noted influences of krautrock and psychedelic musical styles, and the band has also been labelled as "post-punk", "garage rock", and "alternative rock". In a 2025 interview, O'Toole tentatively offered "theatrical alternative music" as the band's self-described style.

Several artists have been cited by members of the band as influences, including the Beatles, the Cramps, Bob Dylan, the Modern Lovers, Harry Nilsson, Pixies, Lou Reed, Sonic Youth, the Velvet Underground and the White Stripes.

== Discography ==
=== Albums ===
Title	Album details
Every Town Needs a Stranger	Released: October 15, 2025

=== Singles ===
Title	Year	Album
"Dirty Feet"	2021	Non-album singles
"Frogs and Tomatoes"	2022	Non-album singles
"The Saddest Man Around"	2022	Non-album singles
"Steely Dan"	2022	Non-album singles
"Get Along"	2025	Non-album singles, later included on Every Town Needs A Stranger
"Space Rocket Simulator"	2025	Non-album singles, later included on Every Town Needs A Stranger
"At the Seaside"	2025	Non-album singles, later included on Every Town Needs A Stranger
"Steely Dan"	2025	Non-album singles, later included on Every Town Needs A Stranger
"One Day"	2026	
