= Eades (surname) =

Eades is an English surname. Notable people with this surname include:

- Gerald Eades Bentley (1901–1994), American academic
- Peter Eades (born 1952), Australian scientist
- Ryan Eades (born 1991), American baseball player
- Sandra Eades (born 1967), Australian physician
- Terry Eades (1944–2021), Northern Irish footballer
- Thomas Eades Walker (1843–1899), British Conservative politician
