= Heist or Hit Records =

Heist or Hit
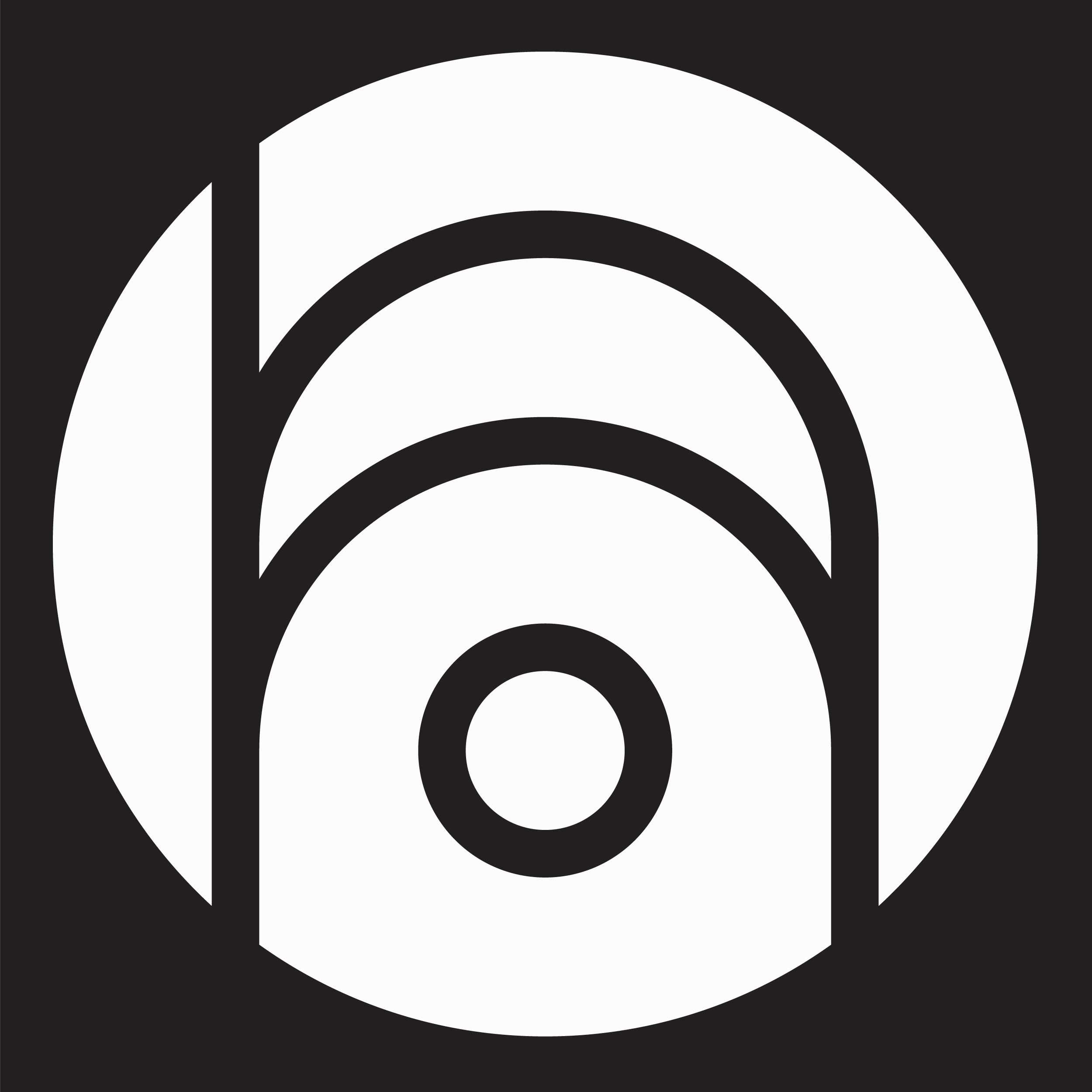
- Founded: 2007
- Founder: Mick Scholefield
- Distributor: The Orchard
- Genre: Indie rock; alternative rock; folk; electronica; dream pop; synth pop
- Country of origin: United Kingdom
- Location: Manchester
- Official website: www.heistorhit.com

Heist or Hit is a multi genre independent record label and music publisher located in Manchester, founded in 2007.

== About ==
Heist or Hit are an independent record label based in Manchester, made up of founder Mick Scholefield, label manager Martin Colclough, social media manager Pat Fogarty, and a team of six. The label’s line-up has included The Answering Machine, Simian Ghost, Westside Cowboy and Her’s.

In 2010 the label was selected as DIY Label of the Week by Huw Stephens on his BBC Radio 1 show. In November 2011 the label was Bethan Elfyn's choice for her 'Label it Up' feature on Amazing Radio.

== Current artists ==
- Cutscene
- Cruush
- Georgian
- Ladylike
- Makeshift Art Bar
- Mleko
- Nature TV
- Pyncher
- The Slow Country
- Two Blinks I Love You
- Wyatt

== Former artists ==
- Her's
- The Answering Machine
- Bad Veins
- Brad Stank
- The Crookes
- Dantevilles
- Dinowalrus
- Eades
- Fantasy Rainbow
- First Love, Last Rites
- Guest Singer
- Hannah's Little Sister
- High Hazels
- Hobby Club
- Honey Moon
- I Am Oak
- JWestern
- Laurel Canyons
- Lei Hope
- Letting Up Despite Great Faults
- LoveLikeFire
- Northern American
- Orpine
- Pizzagirl
- Pomegranates
- Rapids!
- Sea Moya
- SKIA
- Skint & Demoralised
- Simian Ghost
- Still Parade
- Super Market
- Tungz
- Westside Cowboy

== See also ==
- List of record labels
- List of independent UK record labels
