= The Crookes =

British indie rock band

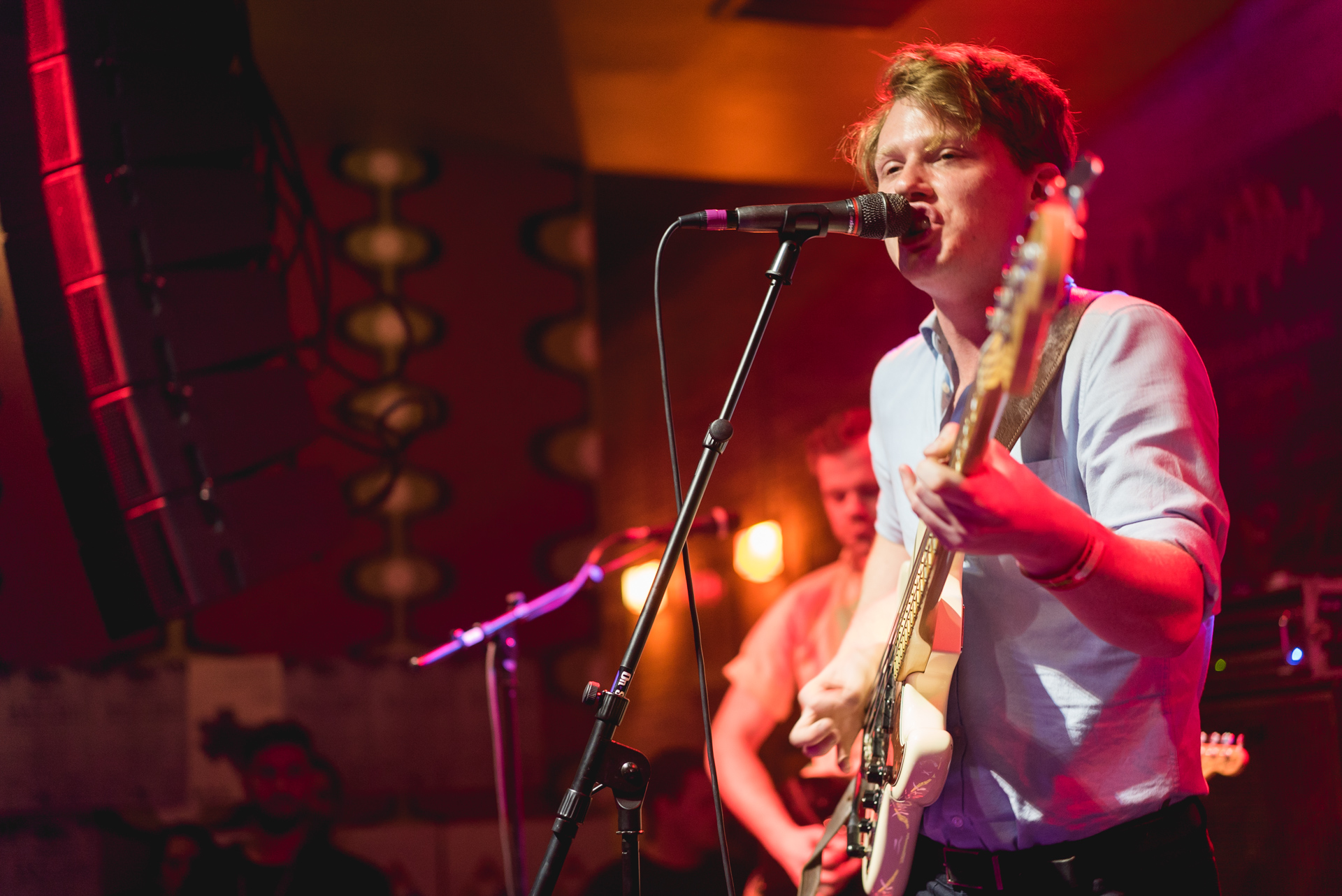

Background information
- Origin: Sheffield, England
- Genres: Alternative rock, indie pop, indie rock
- Years active: 2007–2017
- Labels: Fierce Panda, Modern Outsider, Too Pure, Heist or Hit
- Members: Daniel Hopewell; George Waite; Tom Dakin; Adam Crofts
- Past members: Alex Saunders; Russell Bates
- Website: thecrookes.co.uk

The Crookes were a British indie rock band who formed in Sheffield in 2007. They released their first single "A Collier's Wife" in 2009 as part of the Too Pure singles club, followed by single "Bloodshot Days" that was released on Heist or Hit Records in 2010. Signed to London independent record label Fierce Panda Records, they have subsequently released four albums, Chasing After Ghosts (2011), Hold Fast (2012), Soapbox (2014), and Lucky Ones (2016) along with an extended EP Dreams Of Another Day (2010).

== History ==
The band formed in 2007, naming themselves after the suburb of Crookes in Sheffield, where guitarists Daniel Hopewell and Alex Saunders met before later recruiting George Waite on vocals and Russell Bates on drums.

NME championed the band, describing how "a band this good are unlikely to remain obscure for long".

The Crookes were named as The Guardian Band of The Day in September 2009 being described as having "hints of the win some, lose some C86 brigade, The Smiths (say, circa The Boy With the Thorn in His Side), the plaintive jangle of the Housemartins, even Belle and Sebastian".

In 2009 the band recorded a live session for Steve Lamacq on BBC Radio 1 with Lamacq describing the band as having "ambition and flare and a singer with a beautiful voice; one of those special, poetic voices which dips and soars above their jangling guitars".

The Crookes have also been named as BBC 6 Music's favourite new band, with Lamacq later describing them as his "favourite British band of the year" on BBC Radio 2.

The band's strong Sheffield roots have seen them embraced by the city's established acts, with Jon McClure promoting the band as "Sheffield's next set of musical geniusus", and Richard Hawley describing them as 'absolutely superb' when interviewed on Shaun Keaveny's breakfast show on BBC 6 Music. They recorded a session of Jarvis Cocker's 6 Music show. Moreover, The Crookes were chosen to represent Sheffield for MTV Canada's guide to Breaking Bands in the UK, alongside representatives from other cities such as Glasvegas (Glasgow), Wild Beasts (Leeds) and The Big Pink (London).

The Crookes have recorded multiple live radio sessions for BBC Radio 1, 2, 4, 5 and 6.

The Crookes released their debut single "Bloodshot Days" through Heist Or Hit Records on 5 April 2010.

The Crookes' single "A Collier's Wife" / "By The Seine" was released on 14 September through the Too Pure Singles Club as part of the Beggars Group. It was the fastest selling single through Too Pure, selling out on pre-orders.

Debut album Chasing After Ghosts was released on 21 March 2011 on Fierce Panda Records.

In September 2011 the band posted a message on their Web site stating that Alex Saunders was to leave the band. They wrote "He left for personal reasons and completely amicably". The band then went on to explain that ending the band was "Simply not an option for The Crookes". They immediately drafted in a replacement guitarist Tom Dakin, of Sheffield-based band Silent Film Project, to play on impending two month UK and European tour.

In December 2011 Tom Dakin became a full member of the band and began working on songs with the group for their second album.

Second studio album Hold Fast was released on 9 July 2012 on Fierce Panda Records.

On 11 June 2013, the Crookes announced they had signed their first American recording contract with Austin-based indie label Modern Outsider, stating further that they would be releasing a special version of Hold Fast in America later in 2013 and be playing live dates there before the end of the year. Modern Outsider revealed on 17 July 2013 that the American version of Hold Fast, including bonus tracks of previously released UK "Afterglow" b-side "Honey" and May 2013 singles "Bear's Blood" and "Dance in Colour," will be released in the U.S. on 1 October 2013.

In a July 2013 interview with Between the Earphones, Hopewell explained that the new songs the Crookes were writing sounded "far more confident than we've ever been... we're trying things that we would have never even considered before and I’m really pleased with the results."

On 20 August 2013, the Crookes wrote a Tumblr post revealing that they were in the middle of writing their third album, stating "it's going very well thank you," but were still looking for a place to record it.

On 7 January 2014, the band announced their third album would be called Soapbox and would be released on 14 April 2014 in the UK and Europe and 15 April 2014 in America. The announcement included a link to a short teaser video on YouTube that included clips of the band recording the album in a church in Valle di Preone in the northern Italian mountains and the track listing of the 10-song album.

The music video to "Play Dumb" was released on 13 January 2014. The video features lead singer George Waite being forced to sit through a makeover, dressing him up "into something he could never be", highlighting the band's reluctance to compromise for people who don't support them.

On Valentine's Day, 14 February 2014, the boys released a music video to "Holy Innocents", the fifth track from Soapbox.

As of 1 February 2015, it was announced that the band's drummer since the start, Russell Bates, will no longer be playing with the band.

On 12 July 2017, The Crookes announced their split with a letter to fans. "We remain the best of friends and always will be. We have had an incredible life together as a band and we’re very proud of everything we’ve achieved. The last decade has been very good to us and we are happy to be going out on a high note."

== Formation of Anywhere Records ==
On 14 April 2015, the band announced via Clash that they would be starting their own record label, Anywhere Records. "We’ve always believed in taking a DIY approach to the music industry and the creation of Anywhere Records gives us a chance to put our stamp on something completely new; something we’ll have total control of," said Tom Dakin in the Press Release.

The first release on Anywhere Records will be the band's 4th studio album, 'Lucky Ones' due out 29 January 2016.

== Style ==
The band's style has been described as a fusion of "heartbreaking melodies". inspired by 1950s and 1960s pop music and Kitchen sink realism.

Lamacq has highlighted the eclectic comparisons which span bands such as The Smiths, Orange Juice and The Everly Brothers, whilst also encapsulating the Romanticism of the band on his website.

"They are kings of romance (an important part of the New Pop brewing around the UK)... There is something almost subversive about their odd mix of influences (The Smiths/’60s girl groups/’50s rock and roll)... It’s the romance of the Seine, of walking in the Peaks; or lying on your back reading and daydreaming".

Noel Gallagher said of the band, "they've got good lyrics. All bands from Sheffield have good lyrics". Whilst publications have picked up on the narrative quality of the songs, describing early recordings as sounding like novels by Angry Young Men.

== Collaborations ==
To celebrate a one-off special return of 'The Evening Session' with Steve Lamacq and Jo Whiley, The Crookes collaborated live in session with Richard Hawley. Together they performed cover versions of The Jesus and Mary Chain's "Some Candy Talking" and also a version of Longpigs' (Hawley's former band) "Lost Myself".

In June 2015, during the sessions for recording their album, 'Lucky Ones', The Crookes recorded a song with Misty Miller. The song, 'Ex-Lovers', was released in October 2015 as the B-side to their single 'I Wanna Waste My Time On You'.

== Discography ==
The Crookes discography
- Studio albums: 4
- Extended plays: 1
- Singles: 10

=== Studio albums ===
Year	Title	Chart Positions	
Year	Title	UK	IRL
2011	Chasing After Ghosts: Released: 28 March 2011; Label: Fierce Panda (NONG67)		
2012	Hold Fast: Released: 9 July 2012; Label: Fierce Panda (NONG77); Released: 30 September 2013; Label: Modern Outsider (MODOUT013/MODOUT014)		
2014	Soapbox: Released: 14 April 2014; Label: Fierce Panda (NONG84); Released: 15 April 2014; Label: Modern Outsider (MODOUT021)		
2016	Lucky Ones: Release Due: 29 January 2016; Label: Anywhere Records (ANY002); Release Due: 29 January 2016; Label: Modern Outsider (MODOUT032)		

=== EPs ===
Year	Title	Chart Positions	
Year	Title	UK	IRL
2010	Dreams Of Another Day: Released: October 2010; Label: Fierce Panda (NONG66)		

=== Singles ===
Year	Title	Album	Chart positions	
Year	Title	Album	U.K.	IRL
2009	"A Collier's Wife"	Dreams Of Another Day		
2009	"It's Just Not Christmas Without You"	Non–album release		
2010	"Bloodshot Days"	Chasing After Ghosts		
2011	"Godless Girl"	Chasing After Ghosts		
2011	"Chorus Of Fools"	Chasing After Ghosts		
2011	"I Remember Moonlight"	Chasing After Ghosts		
2012	"Afterglow"	Hold Fast		
2012	"Maybe In The Dark"	Hold Fast		
2012	"American Girls"	Hold Fast		
2013	"Bear's Blood" / "Dance in Colour"	Non–album release		
2014	"Play Dumb"	Soapbox		
2015	"I Wanna Waste My Time On You"	Lucky Ones		

== Band members ==
- Daniel Hopewell (guitar / backing vocals)
- Tom Dakin (guitar / backing vocals)
- George Waite (lead vocals / bass)
- Adam Crofts (drums)
