= List of music venues in Europe =

Venues with a capacity of 1,000+

This is a list of music venues in Europe. Venues with a capacity of 1,000 or higher are included.

== List ==
=== Albania ===
Opened	Venue	City	Capacity
1986	Palace of Congresses	Tirana	2,100
1917	Skanderbeg Square	Tirana	200,000
November 17, 2019	Arena Kombëtare	Tirana	22,500

=== Armenia ===
Opened	Venue	City	Capacity
October 31, 1983	Karen Demirchyan Complex	Yerevan	2,090 (Concert Hall); 7,200 (Arena)
1935	Vazgen Sargsyan Republican Stadium	Yerevan	16,000
1977	Republic Square	Yerevan	40,000+

=== Austria ===
Opened	Venue	City	Capacity
Unknown	Messe Congress Graz	Graz	14,520
July 9, 1997	Merkur-Arena	Graz	21,000
1963	Olympiahalle	Innsbruck	10,000
1960 (reopened 2007)	28 Black Arena	Klagenfurt	32,000
1984	Posthof	Linz	1,200
1974	TipsArena	Linz	6,000
December 7, 2003	Salzburgarena	Salzburg	6,700
2003	Red Bull Arena	Salzburg	31,985
1913	Konzerthaus	Vienna	1,865
1870	Musikverein	Vienna	2,044
October 30, 2001	Raiffeisen Halle	Vienna	4,200
1881	Marx Halle	Vienna	8,000
1970s	Arena Wien	Vienna	13,400
1957	Wiener Stadthalle	Vienna	16,152
Unknown	Danube Island	Vienna	65,000
July 11, 1931	Ernst-Happel-Stadion	Vienna	68,500
1972	Flugplatz	Wels	82,000
1915	Flugfeld Civitas Nova	Wiener Neustadt	57,216

=== Azerbaijan ===
Opened	Venue	City	Capacity
1990	Heydar Aliyev Sports and Concert Complex	Baku	8,000
May 7, 2012	Baku Crystal Hall	Baku	25,000
September 16, 1951	Tofiq Bahramov Republican Stadium	Baku	31,200
March 6, 2015	Baku Olympic Stadium	Baku	69,870

=== Belarus ===
Opened	Venue	City	Capacity
December 25, 2013	Čyžoŭka-Arena	Minsk	9,500
January 30, 2010	Minsk-Arena	Minsk	15,086
June 12, 1934	Dinamo Stadium	Minsk	22,246
December 31, 2001	Palace of the Republic, Minsk	Minsk	2,700
May 1966	Minsk Sports Palace	Minsk	4,500
June 7, 2025	Belarus National Football Stadium	Minsk	33,000
1950-s	Traktar Stadium	Minsk	5,600
2004	Central Stadium	Gomel	14,307
May 3, 2014	Borisov Arena	Barysaw	13,126
1939	Regional Sport Complex Brestsky	Brest	10,060
1963	Neman Stadium	Grodno	8,500
1937	Vitebsky Central Sport Complex	Vitebsk	8,144
1956	Spartak Stadium	Mogilev	7,350
1969	Torpedo Stadium	Zhodino	6,524

=== Belgium ===
Opened	Venue	City	Capacity
Unknown	Kavka Zappa	Antwerp	1,000
Unknown	Trix Zaal	Antwerp	1,100
2003	De Roma	Antwerp	1,500
November 25, 2016	Queen Elisabeth Hall	Antwerp	2,000
1980	Stadsschouwburg	Antwerp	2,000
March 10, 2007	Lotto Arena	Antwerp	8,050
September 11, 1933	AFAS Dome	Antwerp	23,359
Unknown	Middenvijver Park	Antwerp	47,000
1969	La Madeleine	Brussels	1,050
Unknown	Ancienne Belgique	Brussels	2,000
1984	Le Botanique	Brussels	2,000
1878	Cirque Royal	Brussels	3,500
Unknown	Haas Club	Brussels	4,500
March 11, 1971	Forest National	Brussels	8,400
2013	ING Arena	Brussels	15,000
August 23, 1930	King Baudouin Stadium	Brussels	60,000
1911	Vooruit	Ghent	1,000
2000	Flanders Sports Arena	Ghent	5,000
1987	Flanders Expo	Ghent	13,000
September 21, 2004	Trixxo Arena	Hasselt	21,600
2009	Caserne Fonck	Liege	1,600
Unknown	Country Hall Liège	Liege	7,200
1966	Casino-Kursaal	Ostend	2,000
Unknown	Versluys Dome	Ostend	4,750
1883	Hippodrome Wellington	Ostend	60,000
1974	Werchter Festival Park	Werchter	88,000+

=== Bosnia and Herzegovina ===
Opened	Venue	City	Capacity
1969	Stadion pod Borićima	Bihac	16,000
1982	Zetra Olympic Hall	Sarajevo	18,000
1947	Koševo Stadium	Sarajevo	70,000
1957	Stadion Tušanj	Tuzla	15,000

=== Bulgaria ===
Opened	Venue	City	Capacity
May 18, 2023	Arena Burgas	Burgas	15,000
August 30, 2015	Kolodruma	Plovdiv	7,500
March 31, 1981	National Palace of Culture	Sofia	3,380
July 30, 2011	Arena 8888	Sofia	17,906
July 5, 1953	Vasil Levski National Stadium	Sofia	43,230
September 17, 1968	Kongresna Hall	Varna	6,000

=== Croatia ===
Opened	Venue	City	Capacity
1932	Pula Arena	Pula	5,000
December 28, 2008	Spaladium Arena	Split	10,931
2008	Krešimir Ćosić Hall	Zadar	9,000
1972	Dom Sportova	Zagreb	5,000
1987	Dražen Petrović Basketball Hall	Zagreb	15,000
December 27, 2008	Arena Zagreb	Zagreb	16,500
May 5, 1912	Stadion Maksimir	Zagreb	35,123
1950	Zagreb Hippodrome	Zagreb	~500,000

=== Czech Republic ===
Opened	Venue	City	Capacity
Unknown	Park 360	Hradec Králové	50,000
1986	OSTRAVAR Arena	Ostrava	10,000
February 7, 1885	Rudolfinum	Prague	1,100
1981	Kongresový sál	Prague	2,764
2014	Forum Karlín	Prague	3,000
2019	O_{2} Universum	Prague	4,500
March 7, 1962	Tipsport Arena	Prague	13,150
March 27, 2004	O_{2} Arena	Prague	18,000
May 7, 2008	Fortuna Arena	Prague	20,800
1910	Letňany	Prague	75,000+
1926	Great Strahov Stadium	Prague	250,000
Unknown	Letná Park	Prague	750,000

=== Denmark ===
Opened	Venue	City	Capacity
1953	Aalborg Kongres & Kultur Center	Aalborg	3,000
1999	Gigantium	Aalborg	8,500
1982	Musikhuset Aarhus	Aarhus	1,572
November 1, 1963	Imperial Theater	Copenhagen	1,002
1996	Vega	Copenhagen	1,150
1874	Royal Danish Theatre	Copenhagen	1,600
January 17, 2009	Koncerthuset	Copenhagen	1,800
1959	Falkonersalen	Copenhagen	~2,000
April 22, 1938	K.B. Hallen	Copenhagen	4,500
1920s	Forum Copenhagen	Copenhagen	10,000
1960s	B&W Hallerne	Copenhagen	10,000
February 3, 2017	Royal Arena	Copenhagen	16,000
Unknown	Øresundsparken	Copenhagen	44,000
September 9, 1992	Parken Stadium	Copenhagen	55,000
October 20, 2010	Jyske Bank Boxen	Herning	15,000 (Arena); 4,000 (Theater)
1929	Forum Horsens Stadium	Horsens	30,000
2007	Arena Fyn	Odense	5,500
1941	Odense Stadium	Odense	22,000
2024	Odense Dyrskueplads	Odense	75,000

=== Estonia ===
Opened	Venue	City	Capacity
2004	Rock Café	Tallinn	1,500
2014	Tondiraba Ice Hall	Tallinn	7,700
2001	Unibet Arena	Tallinn	10,000
1928	Tallinn Song Festival Grounds	Tallinn	80,000
1994	Tartu Song Festival Grounds	Tartu	15,000

=== Finland ===
Opened	Venue	City	Capacity
January 1999	Espoo Metro Areena	Espoo	8,000
2011	Musiikkitalo	Helsinki	1,704
1971	Finlandia Hall	Helsinki	1,750
1958	Helsingin Kulttuuritalo	Helsinki	1,800
1966	Helsinki Ice Hall	Helsinki	8,200
April 19, 1997	Helsinki Halli	Helsinki	15,000
1938	Helsinki Olympic Stadium	Helsinki	53,000
2000	Sibelius Hall	Lahti	1,250
2001	Kirjurinluoto Arena	Pori	50,000
September 29, 1990	Tampere Hall	Tampere	1,756
2021	Nokia Arena	Tampere	15,000
1965	Tampere Stadium	Tampere	32,000
1952	Turku Concert Hall	Turku	1,002
November 25, 1990	Gatorade Center	Turku	11,500

=== France ===
Opened	Venue	City	Capacity
2017	Arena du Pays d'Aix	Aix-en-Provence	10,500
September 27, 2008	Zénith d'Amiens	Amiens	6,000
December 14, 1990	Le Galaxie	Amnéville	12,000
1966	Palais des sports de Bordeaux	Bordeaux	2,600
1981	Patinoire de Mériadeck	Bordeaux	4,800
January 24, 2018	Arkéa Arena	Bordeaux	11,300
May 18, 2015	Matmut Atlantique	Bordeaux	42,115
1993	Zénith de Caen	Caen	7,000
2003	Zénith d'Auvergne	Cournon-d'Auvergne	9,400
2005	Zénith de Dijon	Dijon	7,800
1988	Summum	Grenoble	2,990
1968	Palais des Sports	Grenoble	12,500
1989	L'Aéronef	Lille	1,945
November 3, 1994	Zénith de Lille	Lille	7,000
2012	Stade Pierre-Mauroy	Lille	50,000
March 8, 2007	Zénith Limoges Métropole	Limoges	6,000
1989	Le Transbordeur	Lyon	1,800
1962	Palais des Sports de Gerland	Lyon	5,910
1988	Halle Tony Garnier	Lyon	17,000
November 23, 2023	LDLC Arena	Lyon	16,000
1926	Stade de Gerland	Lyon	43,051
January 9, 2016	Parc Olympique Lyonnais	Lyon	59,186
1984	Espace Julien	Marseille	1,000
1970	Le Moulin	Marseille	1,200
1994	Le Dôme	Marseille	8,500
June 13, 1937	Orange Vélodrome	Marseille	67,000
1864	Arsenal de Metz	Metz	1,354
1986	Zénith Sud	Montpellier	6,300
September 8, 2010	Sud de France Arena	Montpellier	14,000
1993	Zénith de Nancy	Nancy	6,000 (Concert Hall); 25,000 (Amphitheater)
October 16, 2017	Plenitude Arena	Nanterre	40,000
January 1, 2000	Le Lieu unique	Nantes	1,200
2006	Zénith de Nantes Métropole	Nantes	8,500
May 8, 1984	Stade de la Beaujoire	Nantes	38,285
April 1, 2001	Palais Nikaïa	Nice	9,000
2013	Allianz Riviera	Nice	44,624
2001	Stade Charles Ehrmann	Nice	55,000
AD 70	Arena of Nîmes	Nîmes	16,300
September 26, 1996	Zénith d'Orléans	Orléans	6,900
October 3, 1907	Salle Gaveau	Paris	1,020
1894	Trianon	Paris	1,091
April 22, 2017	Patrick-Devedjian Auditorium	Paris	1,150
1887	La Cigale	Paris	1,389
November 14, 2014	Auditorium de Radio France	Paris	1,461
1730	Casino de Paris	Paris	1,500
1864	Bataclan	Paris	1,500
1913	Théâtre Mogador	Paris	1,800
1839	Salle Pleyel	Paris	1,913
2015	Philharmonie de Paris	Paris	2,400
December 8, 1932	Le Grand Rex	Paris	2,800
May 26, 1888	Olympia	Paris	2,824
1974	Grand Amphithéâtre	Paris	3,723
1960	Dôme de Paris	Paris	4,500
April 22, 2017	Grand Seine	Paris	6,000
January 12, 1984	Zénith	Paris	6,804
February 11, 2024	Adidas Arena	Paris	8,500
February 3, 1984	Accor Arena	Paris	20,300
October 16, 2017	Plenitude Arena	Paris	32,000
May 25, 1972	Parc des Princes	Paris	47,929
1857	Longchamp Racecourse	Paris	50,000
1879	Hippodrome de Vincennes	Paris	80,000
January 28, 1998	Stade de France	Paris	81,338
December 12, 1992	Zénith de Pau	Pau	7,500
2021	Arena Futuroscope	Poitiers	6,000
February 25, 2001	Zénith de Rouen	Rouen	8,000
2022	Reims Arena	Reims	8,000
Unknown	Musikhall	Rennes	7,000
October 10, 2008	Zénith de Saint-Étienne	Saint-Étienne	7,200
October 16, 1975	Palais de la musique et des congrès	Strasbourg	1,876
January 3, 2008	Zénith de Strasbourg	Strasbourg	12,000
September 7, 1992	Zénith Oméga de Toulon	Toulon	8,875
2001	Le Bikini	Toulouse	1,000
April 17, 1999	Zénith de Toulouse	Toulouse	9,000
1937	Stade de Toulouse	Toulouse	33,150
2004	Grand Hall	Tours	12,000
June 15, 2013	Arena Loire	Trélazé	6,500

=== Georgia ===
Opened	Venue	City	Capacity
2016	Black Sea Arena	Shekvetili	10,000
2014	Bassiani	Tbilisi	1,200
1912	Tbilisi Concert Hall	Tbilisi	2,317
1961	Tbilisi Sports Palace	Tbilisi	11,000
1952	Mikheil Meskhi Stadium	Tbilisi	22,754
1976	Boris Paichadze Dinamo Arena	Tbilisi	54,202

=== Germany ===
Opened	Venue	City	Capacity
Baden-Württemberg
1904	Festspielhaus Baden-Baden	Baden-Baden	2,500
1985	Graf-Zeppelin-Haus	Friedrichshafen	1,300
1967	EWS Arena	Göppingen	5,600
1988	Frankenstadion	Heilbronn	17,200
2004	INTERSPORT redblue	Heilbronn	3.300
1932	Hockenheimring	Hockenheim	100,000
1983	Europahalle	Karlsruhe	9,000
November 11, 1950	Südweststadion	Ludwigshafen	6,100
1927	Capitol Mannheim	Mannheim	1,200
1989	Maimarkthalle	Mannheim	12,500
September 2, 2005	SAP Arena	Mannheim	15,000
1989	Maimarkt-Gelände	Mannheim	25,000
2023	EDEKA Arena	Offenburg	8.000
1959	OberschwabenHalle Ravensburg	Ravensburg	5.000
1984	LKA Longhorn	Stuttgart	1,500
Unknown	SpardaWelt Freilichtbühne	Stuttgart	4,500
May 27, 2006	Porsche Arena	Stuttgart	7,500
September 14, 1983	Hanns-Martin-Schleyer-Halle	Stuttgart	15,500
July 23, 1933	MHPArena	Stuttgart	60,449
Unknown	Cannstatter Wasen	Stuttgart	90.000
Bavaria
1991	Linde MH Arena	Aschaffenburg	6,000
2001	Brose Arena	Bamberg	6,800
1967	Hans-Walter-Wild-Stadion	Bayreuth	32,000
January 11, 1991	Backstage Werk	Munich	1,200
1994	Utopia Halle	Munich	1,500
2007	Kesselhaus	Munich	1,660
2021	Gasteig HP8	Munich	1,800
2004	Munich Tonhalle	Munich	2,022
1985	Gasteig	Munich	2,572
1919	Circus Krone Building	Munich	3,000
1996	Zenith	Munich	5,880
1972	BMW Park	Munich	6,700
2021	SAP Garden	Munich	11,500
August 27, 1972	Olympiahalle	Munich	15,500
May 26, 1972	Olympiastadion	Munich	69,250
1984	Frankenhalle	Nuremberg	5,000
2001	Arena Nürnberger Versicherung	Nuremberg	11,000
1928	Max-Morlock-Stadion	Nuremberg	40,000
1999	Donau Arena	Regensburg	7,600
2003	SATURN-Arena	Ingostadt	6,200
1981	Tectake Arena	Würzburg	4,700
2021	Würzburg Arena	Würzburg	8,000
Berlin
2017	Festsaal Kreuzberg	Berlin	1,000
May 26, 1821	Konzerthaus Berlin	Berlin	1,412
2004	Berghain	Berlin	1,500
1867	HUXLEYS Neue Welt	Berlin	1,600
1910	Admiralspalast	Berlin	1,756
1919	Friedrichstadt-Palast	Berlin	1,895
2009	Astra Kulturhaus	Berlin	2,200
1963	Berliner Philharmonie	Berlin	2,400
1951	Columbiahalle	Berlin	3,500
December 8, 2001	Tempodrom	Berlin	4,200
October 12, 2018	Uber Eats Music Hall	Berlin	4,500
January 23, 1997	Velodrom	Berlin	12,000
December 14, 1996	Max-Schmeling-Halle	Berlin	12,000
July 27, 1951	Parkbühne Wuhlheide	Berlin	17,000
September 10, 2008	Uber Arena	Berlin	17,000
1936	Waldbühne	Berlin	22,290
2009	Flughafen Tempelhof	Berlin	60,000
1936	Olympiastadion	Berlin	74,475
1904	Olympiapark	Berlin	85,000
1888	Treptower Park	Berlin	170,000
1865	Platz der Republik	Berlin	250,000
Bremen
1928	Die Glocke	Bremen	1,400
Unknown	Pier 2	Bremen	2,800
1964	ÖVB Arena	Bremen	14,000
Hamburg
1913	Markthalle Hamburg	Hamburg	1,000
March 7, 2015	Mehr! Theater	Hamburg	1,670
1990	Docks	Hamburg	1,500
Unknown	Audimax	Hamburg	1,674
1908	Laeiszhalle	Hamburg	2,025
2017	Elbphilharmonie	Hamburg	2,100
Unknown	Schuppen 52	Hamburg	3,000
2014	Inselpark Arena	Hamburg	3,400
1970s	Stadtpark Open Air	Hamburg	4,000
1968	Alsterdorfer Sporthalle	Hamburg	7,000
November 8, 2002	Barclays Arena	Hamburg	16,000
July 12, 1953	Volksparkstadion	Hamburg	57,100
1867	Trabrennbahn Bahrenfeld	Hamburg	90,000
Hesse
December 11, 1976	Batschkapp	Frankfurt	1,500
1981	Alte Oper	Frankfurt	2,500
1963	Jahrhunderthalle	Frankfurt	4,800
1988	Fraport Arena	Frankfurt	5,002
May 19, 1909	Festhalle Frankfurt	Frankfurt	13,500
May 21, 1925	Deutsche Bank Park	Frankfurt	58,000
Unknown	Domplatz Fulda	Fulda	10,000
1977	Nordhessen Arena	Kassel	6,100
1966	Stadthalle Offenbach	Offenbach am Main	3,000
2005	Buderus Arena Wetzlar	Wetzlar	5.000
1907	Kurhaus	Wiesbaden	1,350
Lower Saxony
Unknown	Sparkassen-Arena Aurich	Aurich	3,264
2000	Volkswagen Halle Braunschweig	Braunschweig	8,000
1962	Weserberglandstadion	Hamelin	30,000
1980	Capitol	Hanover	1,200
1914	Stadthalle	Hanover	3,600
1964	Swiss Life Hall	Hanover	5,800
2000	ZAG-Arena	Hanover	14,000
September 26, 1954	Heinz-von-Heiden-Arena	Hanover	49,000
1924	Hänsch-Arena	Meppen	13,696
Unknown	Halle 39	Hildesheim	2,361
November 30, 2013	EmslandArena	Lingen	4,995
1954	EWE ARENA	Oldenburg	10,000
Unknown	Almased Arena	Uelzen	9,300
2003	Artland Arena	Quakenbrück	3,200
May 4, 1958	CongressPark Wolfsburg	Wolfsburg	2,600
Mecklenburg-Vorpommern
1996	Jahnsportforum	Neubrandenburg	5,000
1979	StadtHalle Rostock	Rostock	6,600
June 22, 2003	IGA Park	Rostock	13,700
June 21, 2001	Ostseestadion	Rostock	29,000
September 12, 1962	Sport- und Kongresshalle	Schwerin	8,000
North Rhine-Westphalia
October 31, 1930	Rudolf-Oetker-Halle	Bielefeld	1,500
March 5, 1993	Seidensticker Arena	Bielefeld	7,250
2016	Anneliese Brost Musikforum Ruhr	Bochum	1,026
1902	Jahrhunderthalle	Bochum	3,700
2003	RuhrCongress Bochum	Bochum	3,280
1997	Essigfabrik	Cologne	1,200
Unknown	Live Music Hall	Cologne	1,800
1991	E-Werk	Cologne	2,000
1986	Kölner Philharmonie	Cologne	2,000
1998	Palladium	Cologne	4,000
October 17, 1998	Lanxess Arena	Cologne	20,000
September 16, 1923	RheinEnergieStadion	Cologne	50,000
September 2002	Konzerthaus	Dortmund	1,550
1925	Westfalenhallen	Dortmund	16,140
1974	Westfalenstadion	Dortmund	83,000
April 21, 2007	Mercatorhalle	Duisburg	1,746
November 8, 2004	MSV-Arena	Duisburg	31,514
1926	Tonhalle Düsseldorf	Düsseldorf	1,854
1971	Mitsubishi Electric Halle	Düsseldorf	7,500
September 2, 2006	PSD Bank Dome	Düsseldorf	12,500
September 10, 2004	Merkur Spiel-Arena	Düsseldorf	66,500
1902	Saalbau Essen	Essen	1,906
1958	Grugahalle	Essen	10,000
1993	Amphitheater Gelsenkirchen	Gelsenkirchen	7,000
2001	VELTINS-Arena	Gelsenkirchen	62,271
2013	SCHWALBE arena	Gummersbach	4,132
2004	Yayla Arena	Krefeld	9,500
2005	Warsteiner HockeyPark	Mönchengladbach	12,000
July 30, 2004	Borussia-Park	Mönchengladbach	60,250
1979	Jovel Music Hall	Munster	1,500
Unknown	Halle Münsterland	Munster	7,000
April 30, 2012	Music Circus Ruhr	Oberhausen	4,000
September 8, 1996	Rudolf Weber-Arena	Oberhausen	13,000
1957	Vestlandhalle	Recklinghausen	2,500
July 6, 1900	Stadthalle	Wuppertal	1,550
Rhineland-Palatinate
1928	Pfalzbau	Ludwigshafen	1,171
June 21, 1939	Freilichtbühne Loreley	Sankt Goarshausen	15,000
1992	EPG Arena	Koblenz	5,000
Unknown	Arena Trier	Trier	7,500
Saarland
1967	Saarlandhalle	Saarbrücken	5,500
Saxony
Unknown	Messe Chemnitz	Chemnitz	11,500
1969	Kulturpalast	Dresden	1,800
May 16, 1923	Rudolf-Harbig-Stadion	Dresden	32,000
1981	Gewandhaus	Leipzig	1,900
Unknown	Täubchenthal	Leipzig	2,500
1985	Haus Auensee	Leipzig	3,600
May 11, 2002	Arena Leipzig	Leipzig	12,000
August 4, 1956	Red Bull Arena	Leipzig	42,900
1930s	Festwiese	Leipzig	55,000
2004	Sachsen Arena	Riesa	5,500
2000	Stadthalle Zwickau	Zwickau	7,000
Saxony-Anhalt
1889	Steintor-Varieté	Halle (Saale)	1,100
1863	Festung Mark	Magdeburg	1,500
1951	AMO Kulturhaus	Magdeburg	1,673
May 29, 1927	Stadthalle Magdeburg	Magdeburg	2,600
1997	GETEC Arena	Magdeburg	7,782
Unknown	Domplatz Magdeburg	Magdeburg	15,000
1999	Elbauenpark	Magdeburg	20,000
Schleswig-Holstein
1937	Kalkberg Stadium	Bad Segeberg	14,000
1930	Deutsches Haus	Flensburg	1,448
2001	GP JOULE Arena	Flensburg	6,300
1939	Halle400	Kiel	3,000
1951	Wunderino Arena	Kiel	13,500
Oktober 1, 1994	Musik- und Kongresshalle	Lübeck	1,900
Thuringia
Unknown	Messe Erfurt	Erfurt	12,000
Unknown	Domplatz	Erfurt	14,000
Unknown	Steigerwaldstadion	Erfurt	18.599
2014	Sparkassen-Arena	Jena	3,000
Unknown	Kulturarena	Jena	3,000
1999	CCN Weimarhalle	Weimar	1,200

=== Greece ===
Opened	Venue	City	Capacity
August 16, 2016	Stavros Niarchos Hall	Athens	1,400
2004 (reopened 2014)	Athinon Arena	Athens	1,600
March 20, 1991	Christos Lambrakis Hall	Athens	1,961
October 2023	Floyd	Athens	2,300
161 AD (renovated 1950)	Odeio Herodou Attikou	Athens	5,000
1964	Lycabettus Theatre	Athens	6,000
1995	Telekom Center Athens	Athens	19,250
Unknown	Plateia Nerou	Athens	25,000
1869	Panathenaic Stadium	Athens	45,000
1982	Spyros Louis Olympic Stadium	Athens	83,000
July 30, 2004	Galatsi Olympic Hall	Galatsi	6,200
2004	Terra Vibe Park	Oropos	35,000
August 12, 2004	Faliro Sports Pavilion Arena	Palaio Faliro	3,836
1996	Charama	Patras	1,500
2004	Karaiskakis Stadium	Piraeus	34,000
1985	Peace and Friendship Stadium	Piraeus	20,000
Unknown	Fuzz Club	Tavros	2,000
January 2, 2000	Thessaloniki Concert Hall	Thessaloniki	1,464
Unknown	Earth Theatre	Thessaloniki	4,332
June 29, 1966	Nick Galis Hall	Thessaloniki	6,000
2000	P.A.O.K. Sports Arena	Thessaloniki	10,200
1986	Melina Mercouri Open Air Theatre	Ymittos	3,000

=== Hungary ===
Opened	Venue	City	Capacity
March 13, 2003	László Papp Sports Arena	Budapest	12,500
1961	Kisstadion	Budapest	16,800
December 16, 2021	MVM Dome	Budapest	20,000
August 10, 2014	Ferencváros Stadion	Budapest	23,700
Unknown	Kincsem Park	Budapest	65,000
November 15, 2019	Puskás Aréna	Budapest	67,000

=== Iceland ===
Opened	Venue	City	Capacity
2007	Kórinn	Kópavogur	19,000
May 13, 2011	Harpa	Reykjavík	1,800
December 1965	Laugardalshöll	Reykjavík	11,000
2002	Egilshöllin	Reykjavík	18,000
June 17, 1959	Laugardalsvöllur	Reykjavík	28,321

=== Ireland ===
Opened	Venue	City	Capacity
April 1974	Páirc Uí Chaoimh	Cork	45,000
1879	3Olympia Theatre	Dublin	1,600
September 7, 2010	Convention Centre Dublin	Dublin	1,995 (Auditorium); 3,597 (Forum); 2,151 (The Liffey)
1871	Gaiety Theatre	Dublin	1,145
March 18, 2010	Bord Gáis Energy Theatre	Dublin	2,111
September 9, 1981	National Concert Hall	Dublin	1,200
1939	National Stadium (Ireland)	Dublin	2,000
June 25, 1731	Simmonscourt Main Hall	Dublin	6,500
December 7, 2008	3Arena	Dublin	13,000
1868	RDS Arena	Dublin	38,000
May 14, 2010	Aviva Stadium	Dublin	65,000
1884	Croke Park	Dublin	82,300
1957	Pearse Stadium	Galway	26,197
1185	Malahide Castle	Malahide	20,000
1973	Green Glens Arena	Millstreet	8,000
1875	Punchestown Racecourse	Naas	80,000
1780s	Slane Castle	Slane	70,000

=== Italy ===
Opened	Venue	City	Capacity
2005	PalaRossini	Ancona	6,500
2024	ChorusLife Arena	Bergamo	6,500
2003	Teatro Auditorium Manzoni	Bologna	1,236
December 1993	Unipol Arena	Bologna	20,000
1993	PalaOnda	Bolzano	7,200
1995	PalaCatania	Catania	5,000
March 12, 1992	PalaDesio	Desio	8,000
2001	PalaSele	Eboli	8,000
1985	Nelson Mandela Forum	Florence	8,262
September 13, 1931	Stadio Artemio Franchi	Florence	43,127
1962	Palasport di Genova	Genoa	15,000
2004	PalaLivorno	Livorno	8,033
Unknown	Mura Storiche	Lucca	40,000
October 6, 1999	Auditorium di Milano	Milan	1,253
Unknown	Alcatraz	Milan	1,700
2001	Teatro degli Arcimboldi	Milan	2,375
Unknown	Fabrique	Milan	3,100
Unknown	Carroponte	Milan	9,570
August 18, 1807	Arena Civica	Milan	10,000
1990	Unipol Forum	Milan	12,700
January 10, 2026	Unipol Dome	Milan	16,000
July 6, 2024	Fiera Milano Rho	Milan	20,000
September 19, 1926	San Siro	Milan	80,018
1988	U-Power Stadium	Monza	17,102
March 31, 1963	Auditorium Rai di Napoli	Naples	1,000
2001	Arena Flegrea	Naples	12,000
December 6, 1959	Stadio Diego Aramando Maradona	Naples	60,240
November 7, 2009	Gran Teatro Geox	Padua	2,500
August 1996	Vitrifrigo Arena	Pesaro	13,000
1990	PalaCalafiore	Reggio Calabria	8,450
2022	RCF Arena	Reggio Emilia	100,000
1916	Teatro Brancaccio	Rome	1,300
1958	Auditorium Conciliazione	Rome	1,750
April 21, 2002	Parco della Musica	Rome	2,744
1957	Palazzetto dello Sport	Rome	3,500
2008	Stadio del tennis di Roma	Rome	10,500
1960	PalaLottomatica	Rome	11,500
1959	Stadio Flaminio	Rome	30,000
May 17, 1953	Stadio Olimpico	Rome	70,634
Old Kingdom era	Circus Maximus	Rome	150,000
1963	Teatro Ariston	Sanremo	2,000
September 24, 1983	Palaverde	Treviso	6,000
1999	Alma Arena	Trieste	6,943
December 16, 1952	Auditorium Rai di Torino	Turin	1,616
2005	Oval Lingotto	Turin	8,500
December 13, 2005	Pala Alpitour	Turin	15,657
May 14, 1933	Stadio Olimpico Grande Torino	Turin	42,000
1971	Dacia Arena	Udine	40,000
AD 30 (renovated 1913)	Verona Arena	Verona	22,000

=== Latvia ===
Opened	Venue	City	Capacity
Unknown	Palladium	Riga	2,000
Unknown	Skonto Hall	Riga	6,500
June 28, 2000	Skonto Stadium	Riga	8,807
February 15, 2006	Arēna Rīga	Riga	12,000
Unknown	Mežaparks Great Bandstand	Riga	60,000
Unknown	Lucavsala Park	Riga	63,550

=== Lithuania ===
Opened	Venue	City	Capacity
August 18, 2011	Žalgiris Arena	Kaunas	20,000
1925	Darius and Girėnas Stadium	Kaunas	55,000
October 30, 2004	Avia Solutions Group Arena	Vilnius	12,500
1900s	Vingis Park	Vilnius	40,000

=== Luxembourg ===
Opened	Venue	City	Capacity
1954	Luxexpo	Esch-sur-Alzette	15,000
Unknown	Krakelshaff	Esch-sur-Alzette	45,000
September 23, 2005	Rockhal	Esch-sur-Alzette	6,500
1995	den Atelier	Luxembourg City	1,200
June 26, 2005	Philharmonie	Luxembourg City	1,500
April 14, 1982	D'Coque	Luxembourg City	8,300

=== Malta ===
Opened	Venue	City	Capacity
1932	Orpheum Theatre	Gżira	~1,200
Unknown	Marsa Shipbuilding	Marsa	4,500
1850s	Pjazza San Publiju	Floriana	~50,000
December 2006	Malta Fairs & Conventions Centre	Ta' Qali	22,000
late 16th century	Mediterranean Conference Centre	Valletta	1,400

=== Montenegro ===
Opened	Venue	City	Capacity
Unknown	Jaz Beach	Budva	67,800
Unknown	Stadion Malih Sportova	Podgorica	10,000
Unknown	Ćemovsko Polje	Podgorica	20,000

=== Monaco ===
Opened	Venue	City	Capacity
Circa 1985	Salle Gaston Médecin	Fontvieille	3,700
January 25, 1985	Stade Louis II	Fontvieille	16,360
1974	Salle des Étoiles	Larvotto	1,500

=== Netherlands ===
Opened	Venue	City	Capacity
March 30, 1968	Paradiso	Amsterdam	1,500
February 2, 1961	RAI Theatre	Amsterdam	1,750
December 3, 1887	Carré Theatre	Amsterdam	1,756
April 11, 1888	Concertgebouw	Amsterdam	1,962
1970	Melkweg	Amsterdam	1,500
February 1, 2001	AFAS Live	Amsterdam	6,000
February 2, 1961	Europahal RAI	Amsterdam	12,900
June 24, 2012	Ziggo Dome	Amsterdam	17,000
August 14, 1996	Johan Cruyff Arena	Amsterdam	71,000
March 25, 1998	GelreDome	Arnhem	41,000
1995	Chassé Theater	Breda	1,440
1971	Effenaar	Eindhoven	1,200
September 2, 1992	Muziekgebouw Frits Philips	Eindhoven	1,250
1910	Philips Stadion	Eindhoven	35,000
Unknown	De Oosterpoort	Groningen	1,150
2006	Euroborg	Groningen	22,300
1926	Stadspark	Groningen	~75,000
1984	Patronaat	Haarlem	1,000
1972	Paard van Troje	The Hague	1,100
2007	ADO Den Haag Stadium	The Hague	15,000
Unknown	Malieveld	The Hague	50,000
1968	Doornroosje	Nijmegen	1,100
July 8, 1939	Goffertpark	Nijmegen	unknown
July 8, 1939	Goffertstadion	Nijmegen	13,000
2015	Poppodium Annabel	Rotterdam	1,500
1934	De Doelen	Rotterdam	2,200
2020	RTM Stage	Rotterdam	7,842
May 18, 1950	Rotterdam Ahoy	Rotterdam	16,426 (Arena); 6,000 (Club); 4,000 (Theater)
March 27, 1937	De Kuip	Rotterdam	51,100
1998	013	Tilburg	3,000
1995	Koning Willem II Stadion	Tilburg	14,700
2014	TivoliVredenburg	Utrecht	2,000
1983	Stadion Galgenwaard	Utrecht	23,700

=== Norway ===
Opened	Venue	City	Capacity
1978	Grieg Hall	Bergen	1,500
1240	Koengen	Bergen	23,500
March 8, 2009	Unity Arena	Fornebu	23,000
2007	Fredrikstad Stadion	Fredrikstad	12,500
December 19, 1992	Vikingskipet	Hamar	20,000
2007	Sør Arena	Kristiansand	19,000
February 1, 1993	Håkons Hall	Lillehammer	11,500
January 6, 2012	Kilden Performing Arts Centre	Oslo	1,185
1986	Rockefeller Music Hall	Oslo	1,350
October 6, 1913	Det Norske Teatret	Oslo	1,400
March 22, 1977	Oslo Concert Hall	Oslo	1,404
1992	Sentrum Scene	Oslo	1,750
1979	Furuset Forum	Oslo	2,050
December 16, 1990	Oslo Spektrum	Oslo	9,700
September 26, 1926	Ullevaal Stadion	Oslo	28,000
June 20, 1987	Valle Hovin	Oslo	40,000
June 24, 1928	Bjerke Travbane	Oslo	60,000
September 15, 2012	Stavanger Konserthus	Stavanger	1,700
October 7, 2012	DNB Arena	Stavanger	6,000
May 1, 2004	Viking Stadion	Stavanger	16,000
September 17, 1989	Olavshallen Concert Hall	Trondheim	1,240
October 4, 2019	Trondheim Spektrum	Trondheim	12,000
2022	E.C. Dahls Arena	Trondheim	25,000
February 4, 1940	Granåsen Ski Centre	Trondheim	40,000

=== Poland ===
Opened	Venue	City	Capacity
2022	Cavatina Hall	Bielsko-Biała	1,000
July 22, 1956	Stadion Śląski	Chorzów	55,211
2005	Baltic Philharmonic	Gdańsk	1,100
August 18, 2010	Ergo Arena	Gdańsk	15,000
August 14, 2011	Polsat Plus Arena Gdańsk	Gdańsk	43,615
May 12, 2018	Gliwice Arena	Gliwice	13,752
October 1, 2014	NOSPR	Katowice	1,666
May 9, 1971	Spodek	Katowice	11,500
May 12, 2014	Tauron Arena Kraków	Kraków	22,800
June 26, 2009	Atlas Arena	Łódź	14,728
1974	Hala Arena	Poznań	5,500
July 1909	Opera Leśna	Sopot	5,047
November 5, 1901	National Philharmonic	Warsaw	2,000
April 5, 1956	Klub Stodoła	Warsaw	3,000
July 21, 1955	Sala Kongresowa	Warsaw	2,880
1953	Arena COS Torwar	Warsaw	6,304
January 29, 2012	PGE Narodowy	Warsaw	72,900
Unknown	Warsaw Babice Airport	Warsaw	~120,000
September 4, 2015	National Forum of Music	Wrocław	1,804
May 20, 1913	Hala Stulecia	Wrocław	7,000
September 10, 2011	Tarczyński Arena	Wrocław	42,771

=== Portugal ===
Opened	Venue	City	Capacity
1981/renovated 2018	Altice Forum Braga	Braga	13,000
November 16, 2003	Estádio Cidade de Coimbra	Coimbra	50,000
1956	Calouste Gulbenkian Foundation	Lisbon	1,228
August 10, 1993	Belém Cultural Center	Lisbon	1,429
1890	Coliseu dos Recreios	Lisbon	4,000
1890s	Campo Pequeno	Lisbon	10,000
1998	MEO Arena	Lisbon	20,000
August 6, 2003	Estádio José Alvalade	Lisbon	50,095
September 23, 1956	Estádio do Restelo	Lisbon	60,000
October 25, 2003	Estádio da Luz	Lisbon	65,647
Unknown	Parque de Bela Vista	Lisbon	85,000
Unknown	Passeio Marítimo de Algés	Lisbon	165,000
April 15, 2005	Casa da Música	Porto	1,300
1941	Coliseu do Porto	Porto	3,500
1954	Pavilhão Rosa Mota	Porto	5,400
November 16, 2003	Estádio do Dragão	Porto	50,000

=== Romania ===
Opened	Venue	City	Capacity
2014	Berăria H	Bucharest	2,000
1960's	Sala Palatului	Bucharest	4,060
1974	Polyvalent Hall	Bucharest	5,300
1962	Romexpo	Bucharest	40,000
September 6, 2011	Arena Națională	Bucharest	55,879
May 16, 2010	Piața Constituției	Bucharest	53,200
October 1, 2011	Cluj Arena	Cluj-Napoca	30,201

=== Russia ===
Opened	Venue	City	Capacity
Bashkortostan
August 2009	Ufa Arena	Ufa	8,250
Chelyabinsk Oblast
2009	Traktor Ice Arena	Chelyabinsk	7,517
Khanty-Mansy Autonomous Okrug – YUGRA
December 10, 2004	Ugra-Classic	Khanty-Mansiysk	1,000
2008	Arena Ugra	Khanty-Mansiysk	5,500
2016	Neftyanik	Surgut	1,127
2008	Babylon Club	Surgut	1,700
2011	Ice Arena	Surgut	4,000
Krasnodar Krai
2011	Basket-Hall Krasnodar	Krasnodar	7,500
2012	Arena Hall	Krasnodar	1,500
2011	Bolshoy Ice Dome	Sochi	12,000
Moscow
October 17, 1961	State Kremlin Palace	Moscow	~6,000
October 25, 2009	Crocus City Hall	Moscow	7,500
2012	Adrenaline Stadium	Moscow	8,500
April 26, 2015	CSKA Arena	Moscow	14,000
May 26, 2019	Dynamo Central Stadium	Moscow	33,000
September 5, 2014	Otkritie Arena	Moscow	45,360
July 31, 1956	Luzhniki Stadium	Moscow	78,360
Nizhny Novgorod Oblast
1965	Trade Union Sport Palace	Nizhny Novgorod	5,600
Omsk Oblast
2007	Arena Omsk	Omsk	11,000
Perm Krai
1966	Molot Sports Hall	Perm	6,000
Primorsky Krai
2013	Fetisov Arena	Vladivostok	7,000
Rostov Oblast
1967	Palace of Sports	Rostov-on-Don	4,000
Saint Petersburg
2004	Kuryokhin Centre	Saint Petersburg	2,000
2001	Aurora	Saint Petersburg	2,000
1967	Yubileyny Sports Palace	Saint Petersburg	9,000
2000	Ice Palace	Saint Petersburg	12,300
Samara Oblast
2013	Lada Arena	Tolyatti	6,600
Sverdlovsk Oblast
2019	Fabrika	Yekaterinburg	1,000
2007	Tele-Club	Yekaterinburg	2,000
June 2019	Ekaterinburg Expo	Yekaterinburg	5,000
1970	KRK Uralets	Yekaterinburg	5,500
Tatarstan
2003	Basket-Hall Kazan	Kazan	8,000
2005	TatNeft Arena	Kazan	10,400
Tyumen Oblast
Unknown	Baykonur Club	Tyumen	1,000
Yaroslavl Oblast
2001	Arena 2000	Yaroslavl	8,795

=== Serbia ===
Opened	Venue	City	Capacity
1979	Sava Centar	Belgrade	7,000
July 31, 2004	Štark Arena	Belgrade	25,000
Unknown	Usce Park	Belgrade	100,000
May 3, 2018	DVAESTROIKA	Belgrade	n/a

=== Slovakia ===
Opened	Venue	City	Capacity
December 14, 1940	Ondrej Nepela Arena	Bratislava	10,200
1962	Štadión Pasienky	Bratislava	11,591
2006	Steel Aréna	Košice	8,300

=== Slovenia ===
Opened	Venue	City	Capacity
March 1965	Tivoli Hall	Ljubljana	5,600
August 10, 2010	Arena Stožice	Ljubljana	14,500
1957	Ljubljana Hippodrome	Ljubljana	60,000

=== Spain ===
Opened	Venue	City	Capacity
1991	Coliseum da Coruña	A Coruña	11,000
1993	Pabellón Pedro Ferrándiz	Alicante	5,400
2004	Mediterranean Sports Palace	Almería	5,000
1990	Palau Municipal d'Esports de Badalona	Badalona	12,760
November 2004	Bizkaia Arena	Barakaldo	18,640
1940	Sala Apolo	Barcelona	1,300
1892	Paral·lel 62	Barcelona	1,450
1923	Coliseum	Barcelona	1,689
1986	Razzmatazz	Barcelona	2,000
March 22, 1999	L'Auditori	Barcelona	2,200
1908	Palau de la Música Catalana	Barcelona	2,200
2007	Sant Jordi Club	Barcelona	3,500
2000	Barcelona Teatre Musical	Barcelona	3,500
1929	Poble Espanyol	Barcelona	5,200
September 21, 1990	Palau Sant Jordi	Barcelona	17,960
2004	Parc del Fòrum	Barcelona	130,000
August 2, 2009	RCDE Stadium	Barcelona	40,000
1927	Estadi Olímpic Lluís Companys	Barcelona	55,926
1999	Euskalduna Palace	Bilbao	2,164
2010	Bilbao Arena	Bilbao	10,014
November 2004	Bizkaia Arena	Bilbao	26,000
August 25, 2014	San Mamés Stadium	Bilbao	53,289
1966	Plaza de Toros de Burgos	Burgos	9,450
September 3, 1955	Nuevo Mirandilla	Cádiz	20,724
August 23, 1999	Kursaal Congress Centre and Auditorium	Donostia-San Sebastián	1,800
May 17, 2025	Marenostrum	Fuengirola	18,500
1942	Las Mestas Sports Complex	Gijón	10,000
1991	Palacio Municipal de Deportes de Granada	Granada	9,507
December 5, 1997	Auditorio Alfredo Kraus	Las Palmas	1,656
2014	Gran Canaria Arena	Las Palmas	9,870
1948	León Arena	León	10,000
2011	Plaza de Toros de La Ribera	Logrono	11,046
1981	Joy Eslava	Madrid	1,200
1922	Teatro Monumental	Madrid	1,200
November 19, 1850	Royal Theatre	Madrid	1,799
1853	Circo Price	Madrid	2,142
1988	Auditorio Nacional de Música	Madrid	2,324
1958	Sala La Riviera	Madrid	2,500
1985	Auditorio del Parque Enrique Tierno Galván	Madrid	7,488
August 8, 2009	Caja Mágica	Madrid	12,442
March 30, 2000	Palacio Vistalegre	Madrid	15,000
1960; reopened 2005	Movistar Arena	Madrid	15,500
June 17, 1931	Las Ventas	Madrid	23,798
September 16, 2017	Wanda Metropolitano	Madrid	70,813
December 23, 2023	Estadio Bernabéu	Madrid	83,186
2018	Nuevo Espacio Mad Cool	Madrid	100,000
2005	Pavello Menorca	Mahón	5,115
1999	Palacio de Deportes José María Martín Carpena	Málaga	10,000
June 27, 2009	Estadio Ciudad de Málaga	Málaga	10,816
1983	Auditorio Starlite	Marbella	2,200
1994	Palacio de Deportes de Murcia	Murcia	7,454
1922	Plaza de Toros de Pamplona	Pamplona	19,720
April 11, 2025	Parque Tafisa	Pontevedra	25,000
1965	Velódromo de Anoeta	San Sebastián	5,500
1998	Illumbe Arena	San Sebastián	10,241
1993	Anoeta Stadium	San Sebastián	25,000
September 26, 2003	Auditorio de Tenerife	Santa Cruz de Tenerife	1,616
1996	Centro Internacional de Ferias y Congresos de Tenerife	Santa Cruz de Tenerife	15,000
1993	Auditorio Monte do Gozo	Santiago de Compostela	40,000
1988	Palacio Municipal de Deportes San Pablo	Seville	10,200
1997	Estadio de La Cartuja	Seville	60,000
October 25, 2006	Palau de les Arts Reina Sofía	Valencia	1,470
2009	L'Agora	Valencia	6,075
1999	Circuit Ricardo Tormo	Valencia	50,000
September 6, 2025	Roig Arena	Valencia	20,000
1982	Estadio José Zorrilla	Valladolid	26,451
December 30, 1928	Balaídos	Vigo	40,055
1941	Iradier Arena	Vitoria-Gasteiz	10,625
1991	Fernando Buesa Arena	Vitoria-Gasteiz	14,999
1990	Pabellón Príncipe Felipe	Zaragoza	10,744
1957	Estadio La Romareda	Zaragoza	33,608

=== Sweden ===
Opened	Venue	City	Capacity
May 18, 1971	Scandinavium	Gothenburg	14,000
May 29, 1958	Ullevi	Gothenburg	75,000
2011	Löfbergs Arena	Karlstad	10,300
2010	Kristianstad Arena	Kristianstad	5,000
2004	Saab Arena	Linköping	11,500
November 6, 2008	Malmö Arena	Malmö	15,500
1968	Malmö Isstadion	Malmö	5,800
2008	Conventum Arena	Örebro	6,000
August 26, 2006	Hägglunds Arena	Örnsköldsvik	9,800
1892	Cirkus	Stockholm	1,650
Unknown	Münchenbryggeriet	Stockholm	1,750
1985	Annexet	Stockholm	3,950
November 4, 1955	Hovet	Stockholm	9,000
February 19, 1989	Avicii Arena	Stockholm	16,000
July 20, 2013	3Arena	Stockholm	45,000
1950	Gärdet	Stockholm	70,000
October 27, 2012	Strawberry Arena	Solna	65,000
Unknown	Uppsala Arena	Uppsala	10,000
May 30, 2009	Göransson Arena	Sandviken	10,951

=== Switzerland ===
Opened	Venue	City	Capacity
1976	St. Jakobshalle	Basel	12,400
2001	St. Jakob-Park	Basel	40,000
1967	PostFinance Arena	Bern	17,131
July 30, 2005	Stadion Wankdorf	Bern	45,000
Unknown	Pferderennbahn Frauenfeld	Frauenfeld	~59,768
November 1, 1995	SEG Geneva Arena	Geneva	9,500
April 30, 2003	Stade de Genève	Geneva	40,000
Unknown	Les Docks	Lausanne	1,000
1921	Palais de Beaulieu	Lausanne	1,844
September 24, 2019	Vaudoise Aréna	Lausanne	12,000
1904	Stade Olympique de la Pontaise	Lausanne	45,000
1908	Théâtre du Jorat	Mézières	1,000
1973	Miles Davis Hall	Montreux	2,000
1973	Stravinski Auditorium	Montreux	4,000
May 21, 2016	Stadium Saussaz	Montreux	15,000
1970s	Volkshaus	Zürich	1,200
October 19, 1895	Tonhalle	Zürich	1,455
January 27, 2017	Halle 622	Zürich	3,500
January 27, 2017	The Hall	Zürich	5,060
November 4, 1939	Hallenstadion	Zürich	15,000
August 30, 2007	Letzigrund	Zürich	50,044
1914	Militärflugplatz Dübendorf	Zürich	~70,314
2010	Bossard Arena	Zug	7,200

=== Turkey ===
Opened	Venue	City	Capacity
2010	Ankara Arena	Ankara	10,400
2024	Pearl Event Area	Antalya	2,500
January 27, 2012	Ataköy Athletics Arena	Istanbul	7,450
January 25, 2012	Ülker Sports Arena	Istanbul	15,000
Unknown	ITU Stadium	Istanbul	36,750
April 2015	Vodafone Park	Istanbul	41,903
January 15, 2011	Türk Telekom Stadium	Istanbul	70,000
July 31, 2002	Atatürk Olympic Stadium	Istanbul	79,414
1971	İzmir Atatürk Stadium	İzmir	51,337

=== Ukraine ===
Opened	Venue	City	Capacity
1994	Freedom Hall	Kyiv	1,000
May 20, 2011	Stereo Plaza	Kyiv	6,000
1960	Palace of Sports	Kyiv	10,200
October 2002	International Exhibition Centre	Kyiv	18,000
August 12, 1923	NSC Olimpiyskiy	Kyiv	70,050

=== United Kingdom and British Overseas Territories ===
Opened	Venue	City	Capacity
England
March 9, 1912	Prenton Park	Birkenhead	15,000
1560	Chatsworth House	Bakewell	14,600
1934	Bath Forum	Bath	2,000
1894	Recreation Ground	Bath	14,500
May 27, 1901	New Alexandra Theatre	Birmingham	1,347
2015	O_{2} Institute Birmingham	Birmingham	1,500
1991	Symphony Hall	Birmingham	2,262
September 10, 2009	O_{2} Academy Birmingham	Birmingham	3,859
December 5, 1980	Bp pulse LIVE	Birmingham	15,685
October 4, 1991	Utilita Arena Birmingham	Birmingham	15,800
1897	Villa Park	Birmingham	42,785
1921	King George's Hall	Blackburn	1,800
1889	Opera House Theatre	Blackpool	2,920
1896	Empress Ballroom	Blackpool	3,000
July 14, 2001	Bolton Arena	Bolton	6,000
1997	Toughsheet Community Stadium	Bolton	40,000
2009	O_{2} Academy Bournemouth	Bournemouth	1,800
August 16, 1984	BIC Windsor Hall	Bournemouth	4,045
August 29, 1853	St George's Hall	Bradford	1,335
1867	Brighton Dome	Brighton	1,800
1963	Pryzm Brighton	Brighton	2,350
1977	Brighton Centre	Brighton	4,000
2001	O_{2} Academy Bristol	Bristol	1,650
1912	Bristol Hippodrome	Bristol	1,951
1860	Bristol Beacon	Bristol	2,075
1887	Ashton Gate Stadium	Bristol	27,000
2011	Electric Brixton	Brixton	1,500
1929	O_{2} Brixton Academy	Brixton	4,921
1875	Cambridge Corn Exchange	Cambridge	1,681
2008	Colchester Community Stadium	Colchester	10,105
1985	The Sands Centre	Carlisle	1,800
2005	Ericsson Exhibition Hall	Coventry	8,000
2005	Coventry Building Society Arena	Coventry	40,000
2003	The Darlington Arena	Darlington	25,500
August 3, 2007	Eco-Power Stadium	Doncaster	15,231
1882	Durham County Cricket Club	Durham	15,000
1990	Westpoint Exeter	Exeter	7,500
1390	Powderham Castle	Exeter	14,860
August 27, 1955	Gateshead International Stadium	Gateshead	30,000
1891	Kingsholm Stadium	Gloucester	12,000
1771	Harewood House	Harewood	20,000
1872	Hove County Cricket Ground	Hove	7,000
1994	Kirklees Stadium	Huddersfield	24,121
August 30, 2018	Connexin Live Arena	Hull	3,500
1989	Craven Park	Hull	12,225
1929	Regent Theatre	Ipswich	1,551
1884	Portman Road Stadium	Ipswich	29,673
1851	Osborne House	Isle of Wight	10,000
1858	Leeds Town Hall	Leeds	1,200
2008	O_{2} Academy Leeds	Leeds	2,300
September 4, 2013	First Direct Arena	Leeds	13,500
1872	Roundhay Park	Leeds	100,000
2010	O_{2} Academy Leicester	Leicester	1,450
2002	King Power Stadium	Leicester	32,262
2006	The Engine Shed	Lincoln	1,600
1895	Sincil Bank	Lincoln	10,120
Unknown	O_{2} Academy Liverpool	Liverpool	1,200
March 9, 1925	Liverpool Empire Theatre	Liverpool	2,348
2008	M&S Bank Arena	Liverpool	11,000
1884	Anfield	Liverpool	61,276
2025	Hill Dickinson Stadium	Liverpool	52,769
2003	Egg London	London	1,000
1990	Koko	London	1,410
1930	Electric Ballroom	London	1,100
1979	Heaven	London	1,725
August 17, 1903	O_{2} Shepherds Bush Empire	London	2,000
1910	London Palladium	London	2,286
1993	O_{2} Forum Kentish Town	London	2,300
1951	London Coliseum	London	2,359
2007	Indigo at The O_{2}	London	2,720
1932	Troxy	London	3,100
March 28, 1932	Eventim Apollo	London	5,039
March 29, 1871	Royal Albert Hall	London	5,272
2011	Copper Box Arena	London	7,500
1886	Olympia	London	10,000
1873	Alexandra Palace	London	10,400
1934	OVO Arena Wembley	London	12,500
1963	Twickenham Stoop	London	14,816
June 24, 2007	The O_{2} Arena	London	20,000
1964	Crystal Palace National Sports Centre	London	24,000
1845	Kia Oval	London	27,500
July 22, 2006	Emirates Stadium	London	60,260
April 3, 2019	Tottenham Hotspur Stadium	London	62,850
May 6, 2012	London Stadium	London	66,000
1907	Twickenham Stadium	London	82,000
March 9, 2007	Wembley Stadium	London	90,000
1637	Hyde Park	London	~200,000
1927	The Ritz	Manchester	1,500
May 18, 1891	Palace Theatre	Manchester	1,955
1910	Albert Hall	Manchester	2,290
September 11, 1996	Bridgewater Hall	Manchester	2,341
October 18, 1990	Manchester Academy	Manchester	2,600
August 29, 1938	O_{2} Apollo Manchester	Manchester	3,500
2012	O_{2} Victoria Warehouse	Manchester	3,500
2023	Aviva Studios	Manchester	7,000
1993	Castlefield Bowl	Manchester	8,450
1880	Manchester Central	Manchester	12,500
May 14, 2024	Co-op Live	Manchester	20,500
July 15, 1995	AO Arena	Manchester	21,000
1857	Emirates Old Trafford	Manchester	26,000
July 25, 2002	Etihad Stadium	Manchester	60,000
February 19, 1910	Old Trafford	Manchester	74,140
1995	Riverside Stadium	Middlesbrough	34,742
1979	National Bowl	Milton Keynes	65,000
October 14, 2005	NX	Newcastle	2,000
1927	Newcastle City Hall	Newcastle	2,135
November 18, 1995	Utilita Arena Newcastle	Newcastle	11,000
1892	St James' Park	Newcastle	52,400
1667	Newmarket Racecourse	Newmarket	45,000
1758	Theatre Royal	Norwich	1,308
2008	OPEN Norwich	Norwich	1,450
August 31, 1935	Carrow Road	Norwich	43,984
1980	Rock City	Nottingham	2,450
November 27, 1982	Royal Concert Hall	Nottingham	2,500
April 1, 2000	Motorpoint Arena Nottingham	Nottingham	15,865
1898	City Ground	Nottingham	30,404
1995	O_{2} Academy Oxford	Oxford	1,150
1836	New Theatre Oxford	Oxford	1,800
1991	Plymouth Pavilions	Plymouth	4,000
1892	Home Park	Plymouth	16,388
1991	Portsmouth Pyramids	Portsmouth	1,250
1985	Portsmouth Guildhall	Portsmouth	2,500
November 7, 1977	The Hexagon	Reading	1,686
August 22, 1998	Madejski Stadium	Reading	24,161
Unknown	Broadlands	Romsey	13,000
1932	Scarborough Open Air Theatre	Scarborough	6,500
2008	O_{2} Academy Sheffield	Sheffield	2,150
May 30, 1991	Utilita Arena Sheffield	Sheffield	13,500
2001	St Mary's Stadium	Southampton	32,505
August 30, 1997	Victoria Hall	Stoke-on-Trent	1,600
1888	Bet365 Stadium	Stoke-on-Trent	30,089
1997	Stadium of Light	Sunderland	49,000
Unknown	Oasis Leisure Centre	Swindon	3,000
1967	Assembly Hall Theatre	Tunbridge Wells	1,020
August 30, 1922	Vicarage Road	Watford	22,200
1885	Agaes Bowl	West End	25,000
1964	Cliffs Pavilion	Westcliff-on-Sea	1,630
May 16, 1938	Wolverhampton Civic Hall	Wolverhampton	3,000
1889	Molineux Stadium	Wolverhampton	31,000
1705	Blenheim Palace	Woodstock	17,200
1989	Barbican Centre	York	1,900
Gibraltar
1926	Victoria Stadium	Gibraltar	5,000
2019	Europa Point Sports Complex	Gibraltar	8,066
Northern Ireland
1949	Whitla Hall	Belfast	1,250
1862	Ulster Hall	Belfast	1,850
1997	Waterfront Hall	Belfast	2,250
2000	O_{2} Belfast	Belfast	10,500
1830	Stormont Castle	Belfast	15,000
1905	Windsor Park	Belfast	22,000
1900s	Titanic Slipways	Belfast	30,000
1828	Botanic Gardens	Belfast	40,000
Unknown	Boucher Road Playing Fields	Belfast	42,500
1871	Ormeau Park	Belfast	~100,000
Scotland
August 10, 2019	P&J Live	Aberdeen	15,000
September 2, 1899	Pittodrie Stadium	Aberdeen	20,866
March 16, 1914	Usher Hall	Edinburgh	2,200
1999	O_{2} Academy Edinburgh	Edinburgh	3,000
August 12, 1929	Edinburgh Playhouse	Edinburgh	3,059
1960	Royal Highland Centre	Edinburgh	8,000
1350	Edinburgh Castle	Edinburgh	8,500
1970	Meadowbank Stadium	Edinburgh	22,500
1925	Murrayfield Stadium	Edinburgh	67,144
1923	Caird Hall	Dundee	2,300
2004	Falkirk Stadium	Falkirk	7,937
2018	SWG3 Galvanisers	Glasgow	1,250
January 1, 2000	SEC Armadillo	Glasgow	2,000
1934	Barrowland Ballroom	Glasgow	2,100
2003	O_{2} Academy Glasgow	Glasgow	2,500
October 6, 2012	Commonwealth Arena	Glasgow	5,000
1999	Braehead Arena	Glasgow	5,200
September 6, 1985	SECC Hall 4	Glasgow	10,000
September 30, 2013	OVO Hydro	Glasgow	12,500
1903	Hampden Park	Glasgow	52,000
December 30, 1899	Ibrox Stadium	Glasgow	50,817
August 20, 1892	Celtic Park	Glasgow	60,411
1450	Glasgow Green	Glasgow	70,000
November 9, 1996	Caledonian Stadium	Inverness	19,400
August 19, 1989	McDiarmid Park	Perth	10,696
Wales
1793	Faenol Estate	Bangor	20,000
November 28, 2004	Donald Gordon Theatre	Cardiff	1,897
March 12, 2016	Ice Arena Wales	Cardiff	3,600
September 10, 1993	Motorpoint Arena Cardiff	Cardiff	7,500
July 22, 2009	Cardiff City Stadium	Cardiff	30,000
June 1999	Principality Stadium	Cardiff	78,000
September 27, 1933	Eirias Stadium	Colwyn Bay	15,000
1982	Venue Cymru	Llandudno	1,450 (Theatre); 2,500 (Arena)
November 15, 2008	Parc y Scarlets	Pemberton	14,547
1100	Caldicot Castle	Monmouthshire	11,750
July 10, 2005	Swansea.com Stadium	Swansea	20,944

== Defunct ==
Years active	Venue	City	Capacity
Greece
2007-2026	Badminton Theater	Athens	2,430
United Kingdom
1985-2023	Newport Centre	Newport	2,000

== Gallery ==
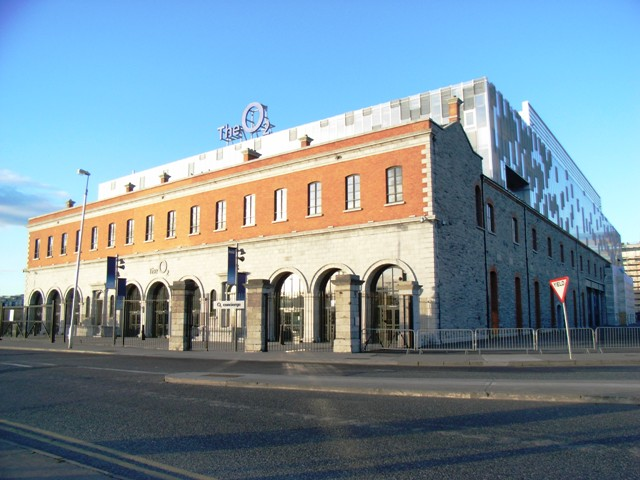
3Arena

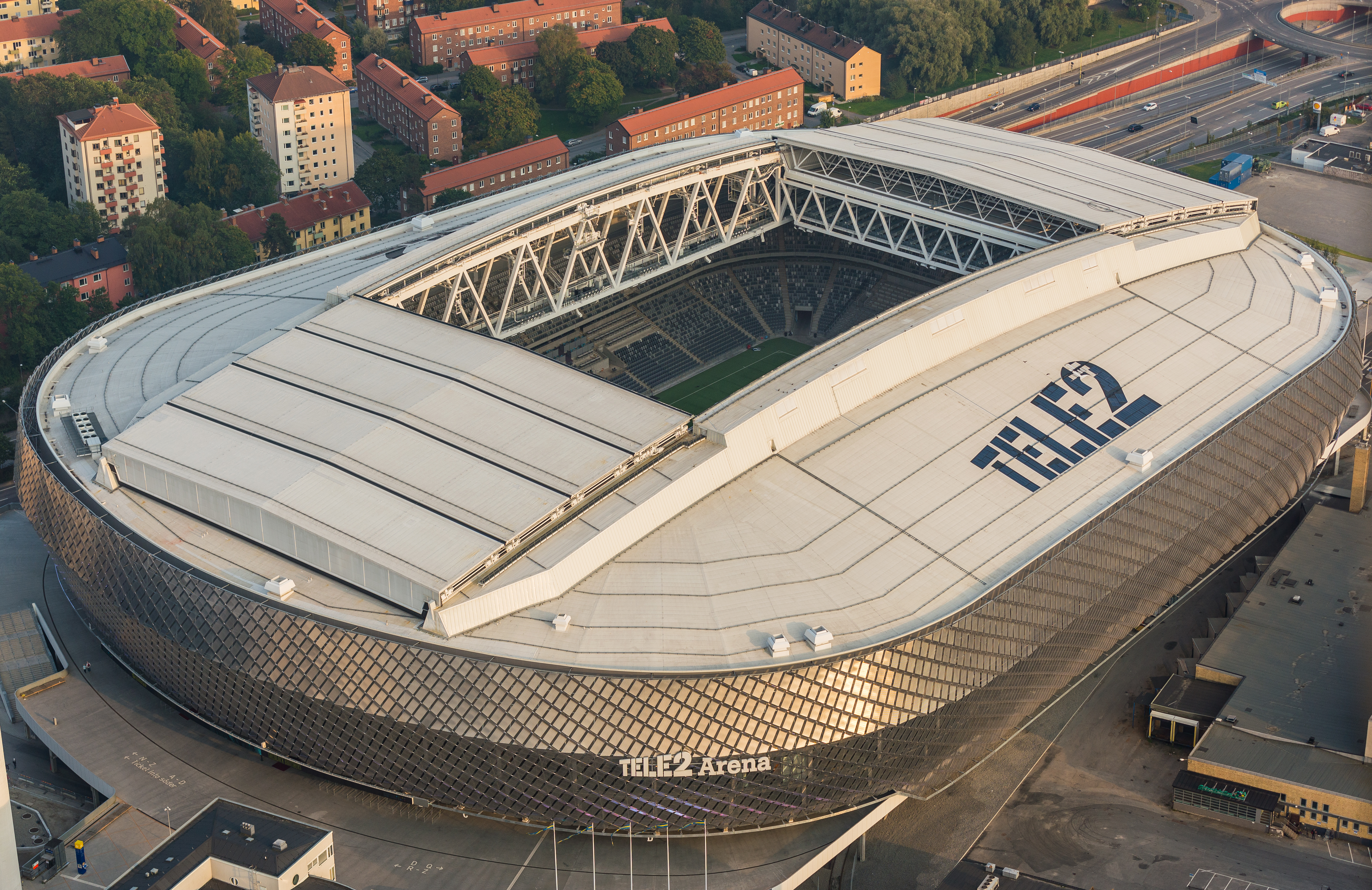
3 Arena

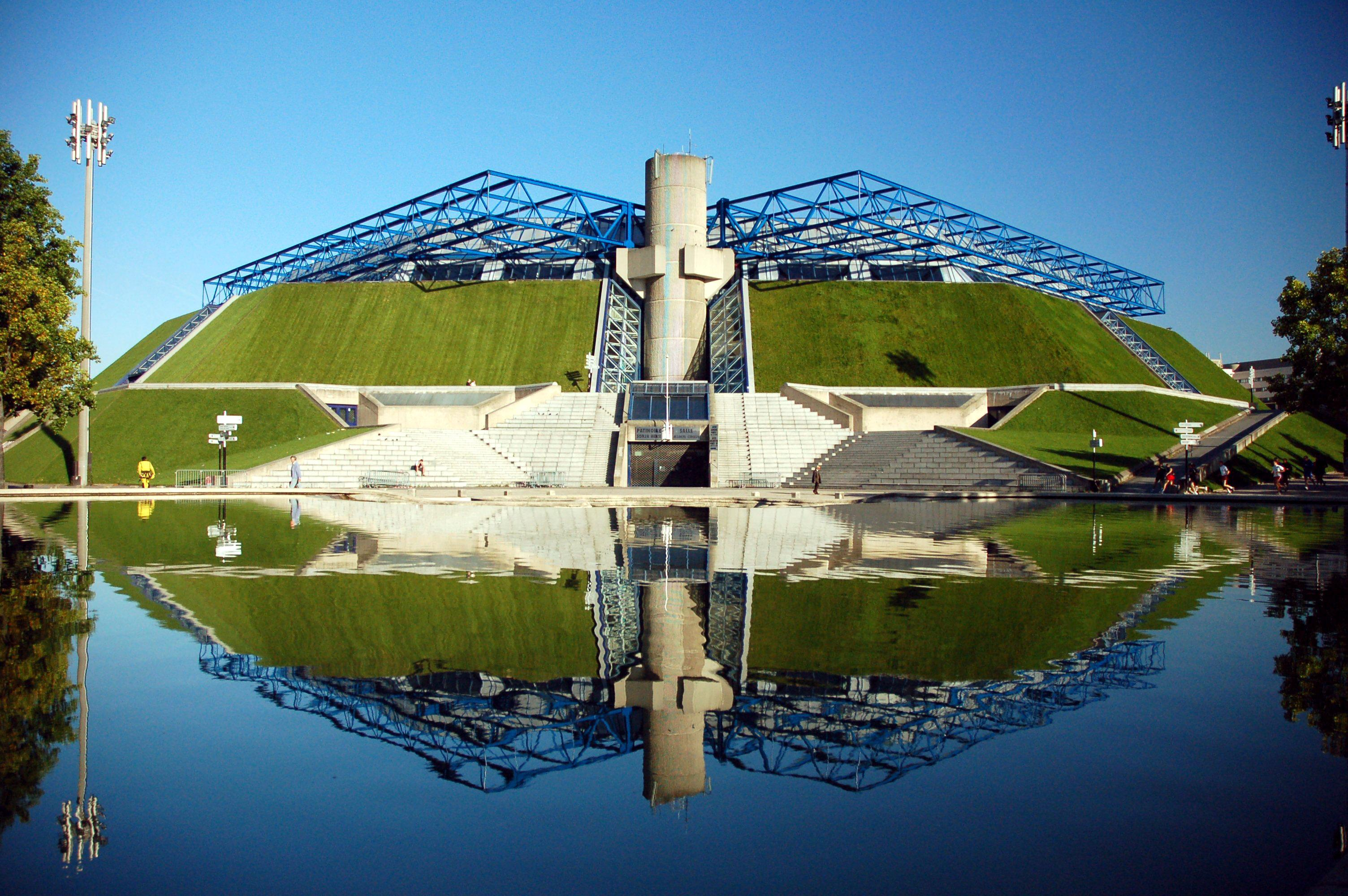
Accor Arena

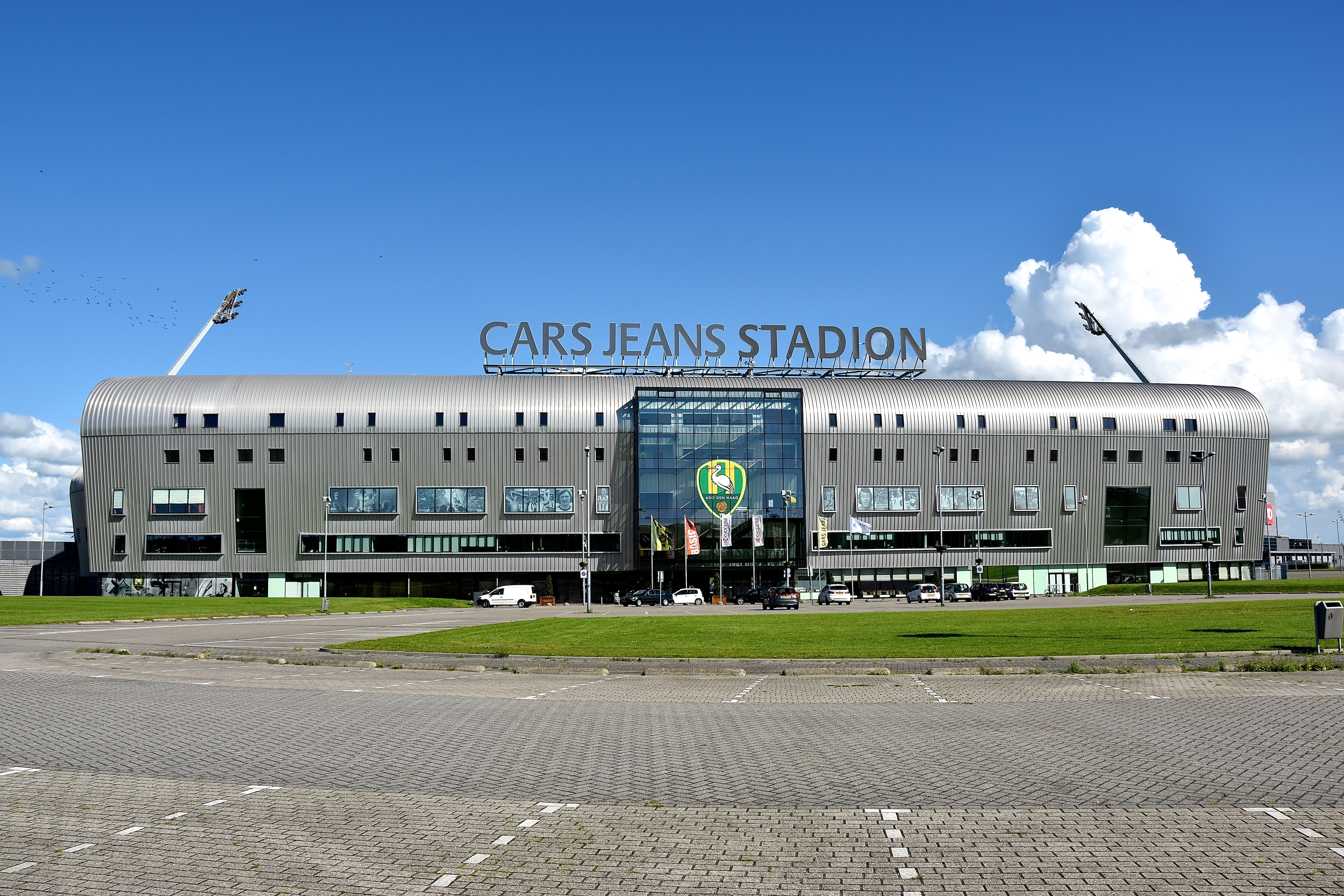
ADO Den Haag Stadium

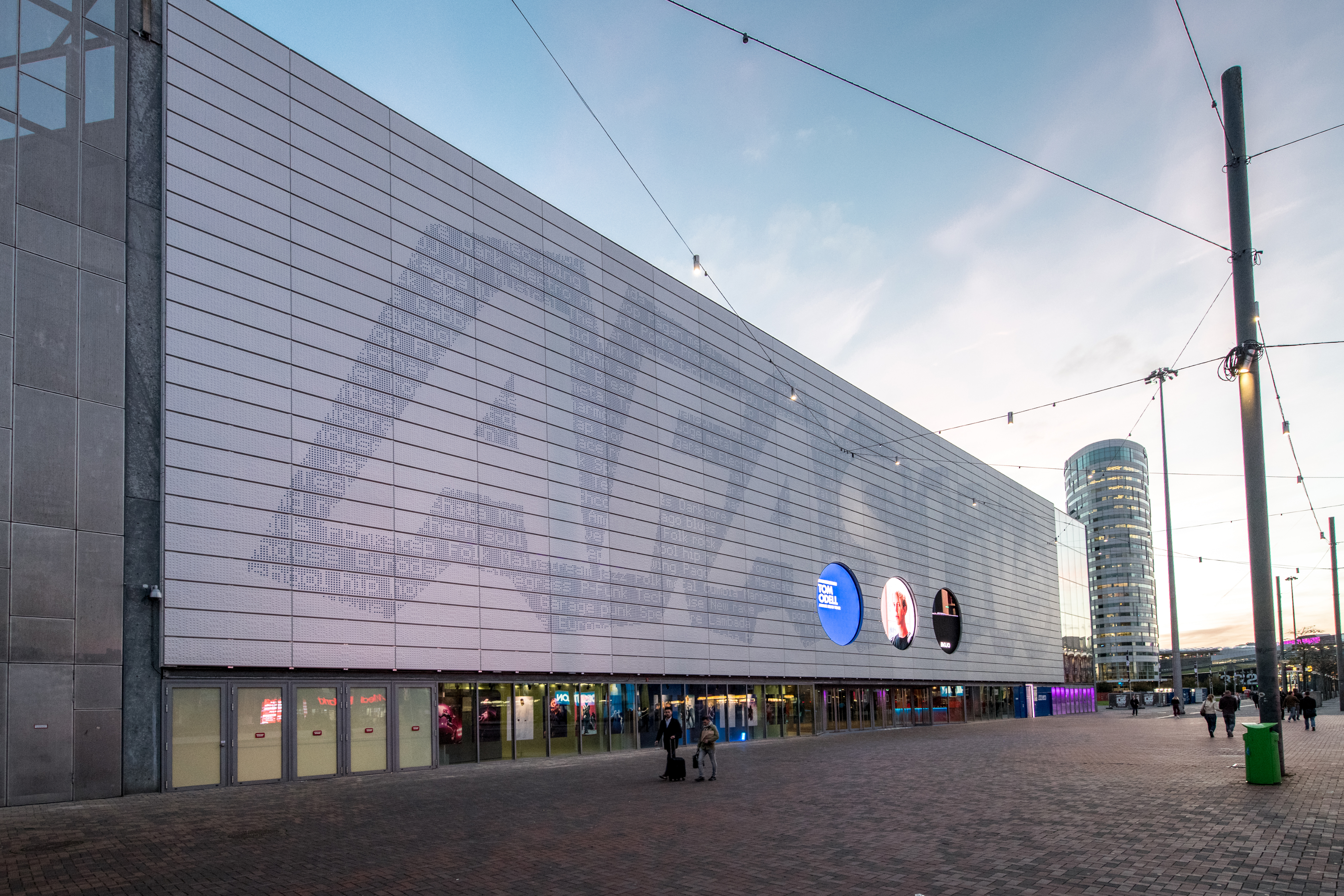
AFAS Live

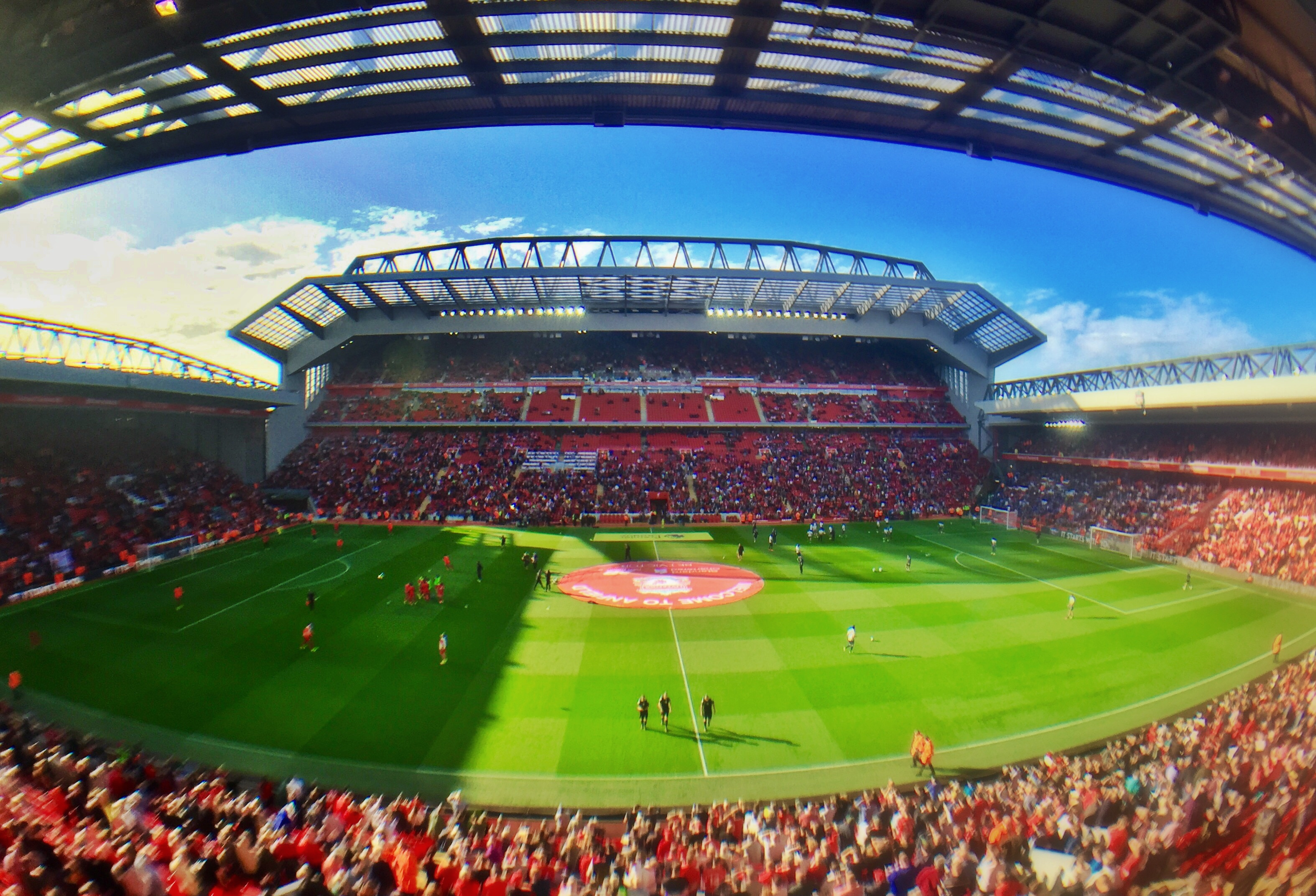
Anfield

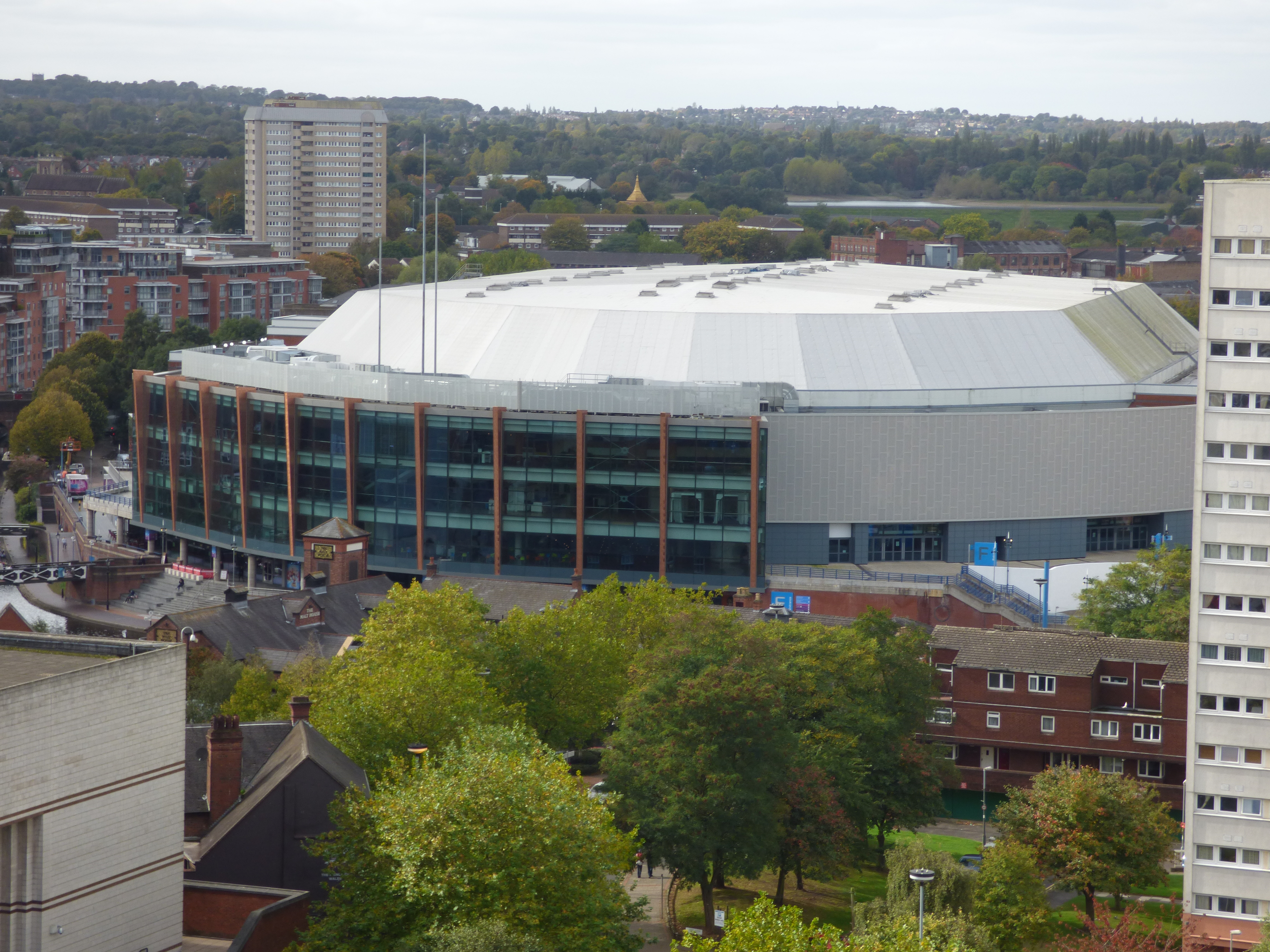
Arena Birmingham

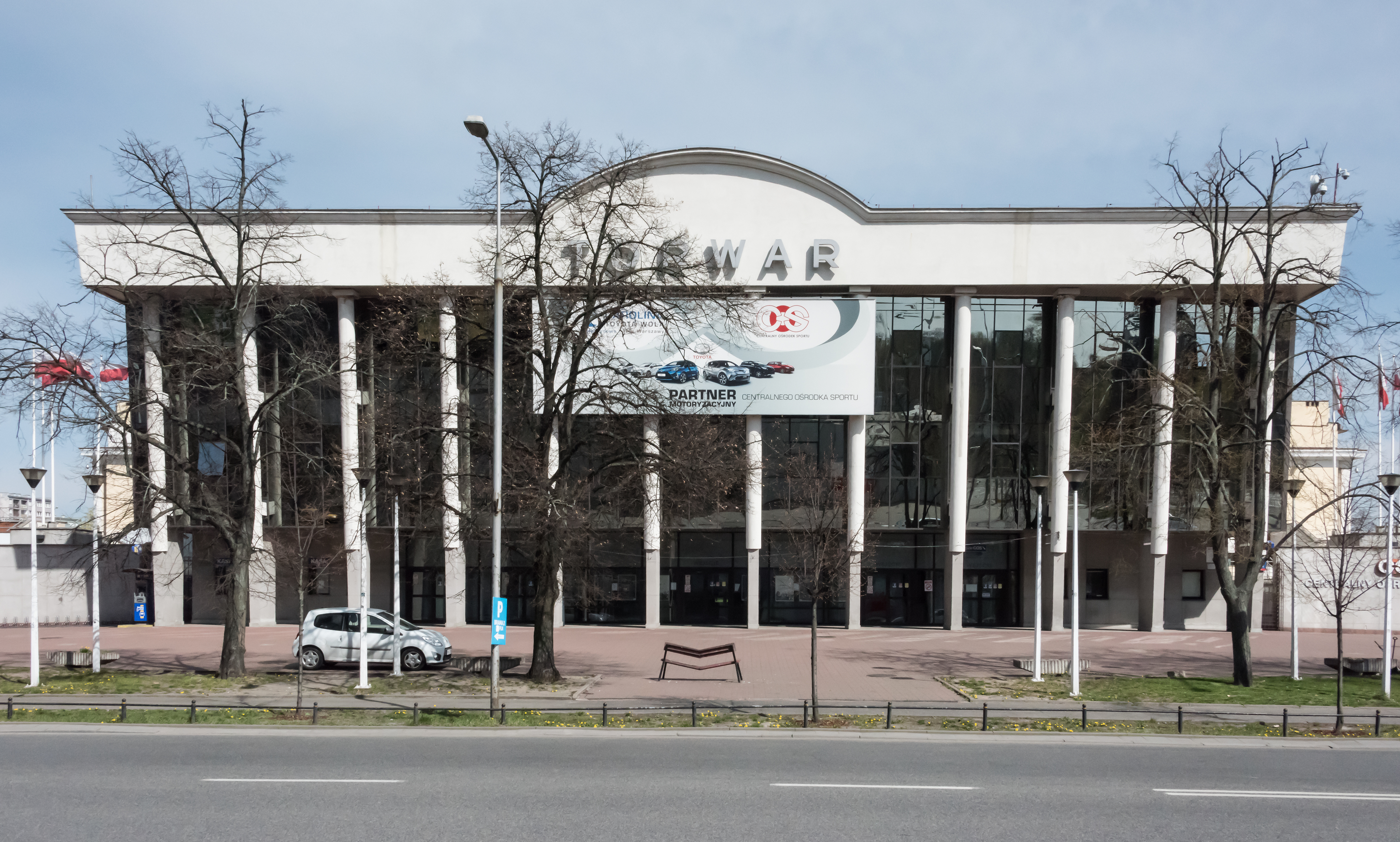
Arena COS Torwar

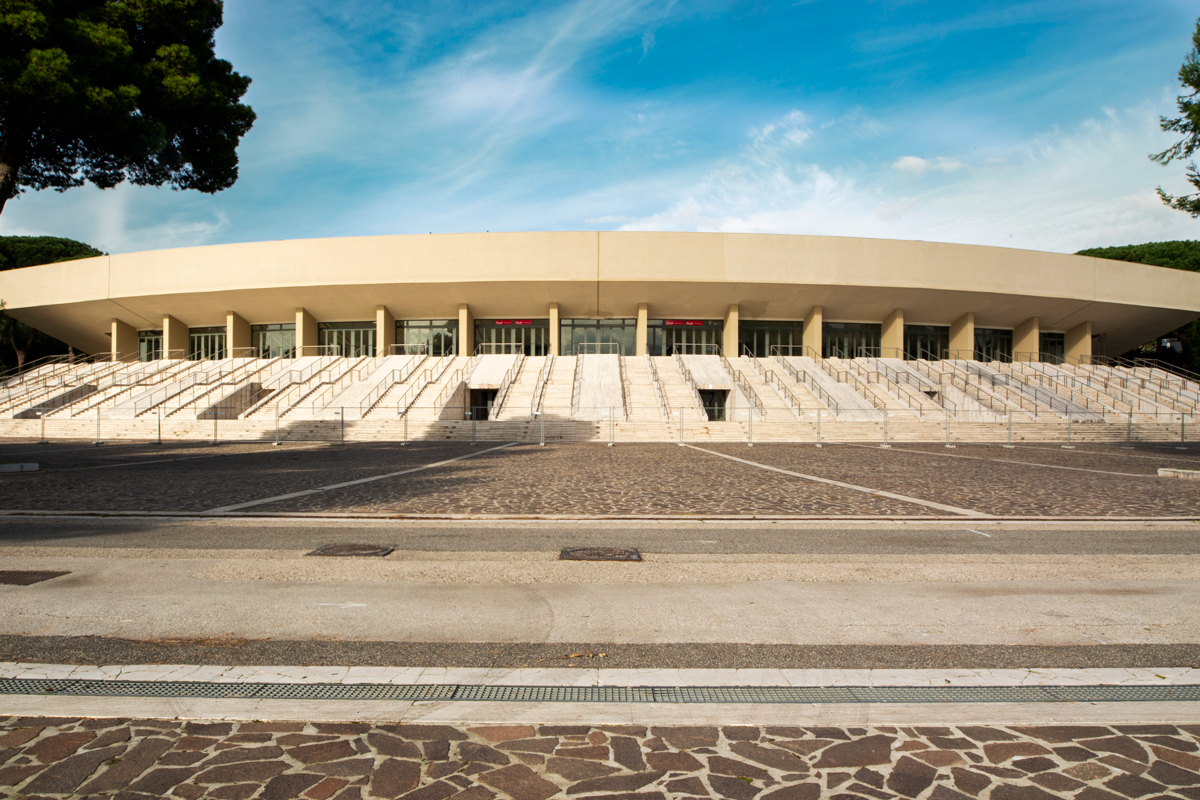
Arena Flegrea

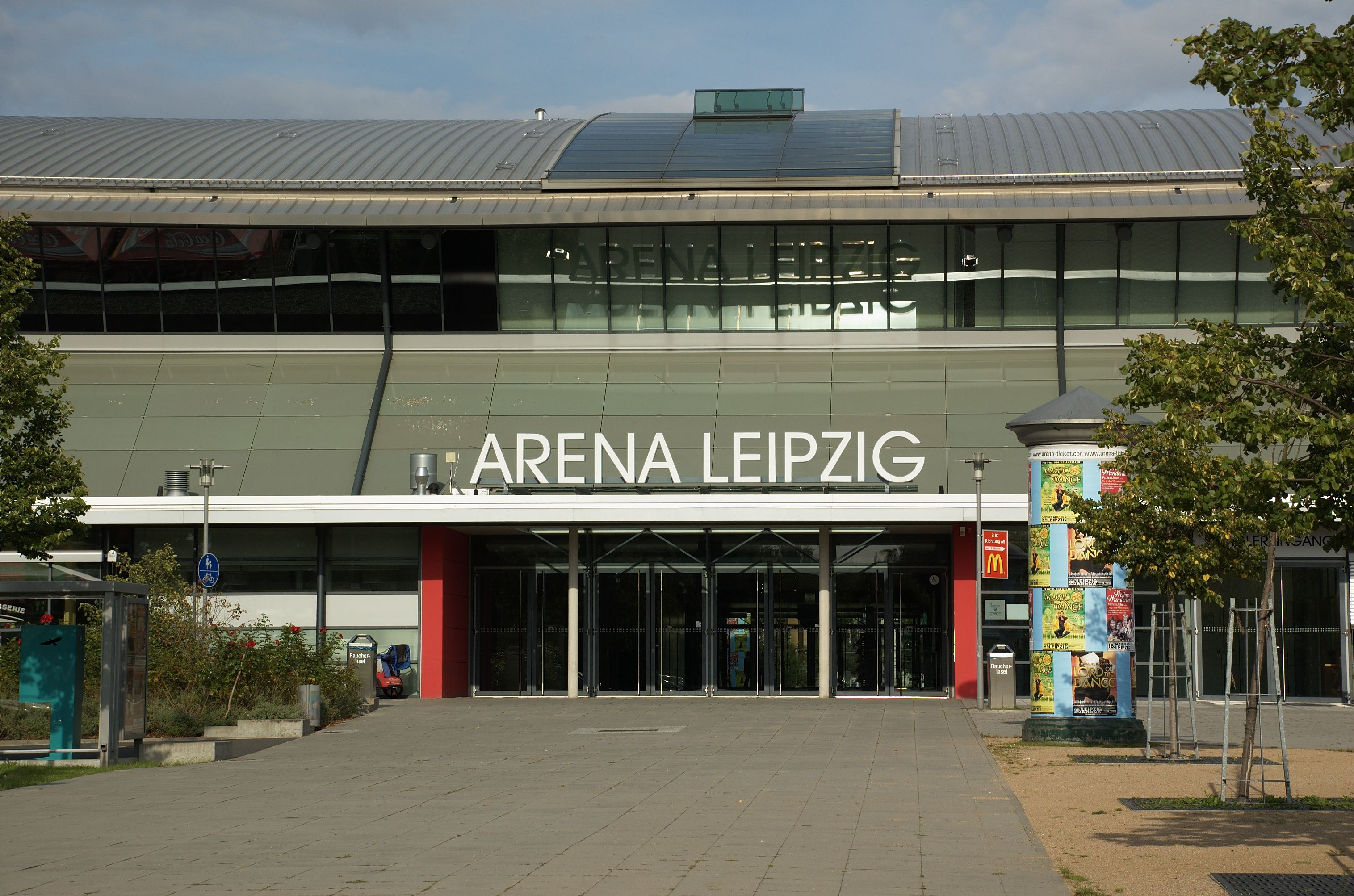
Arena Leipzig

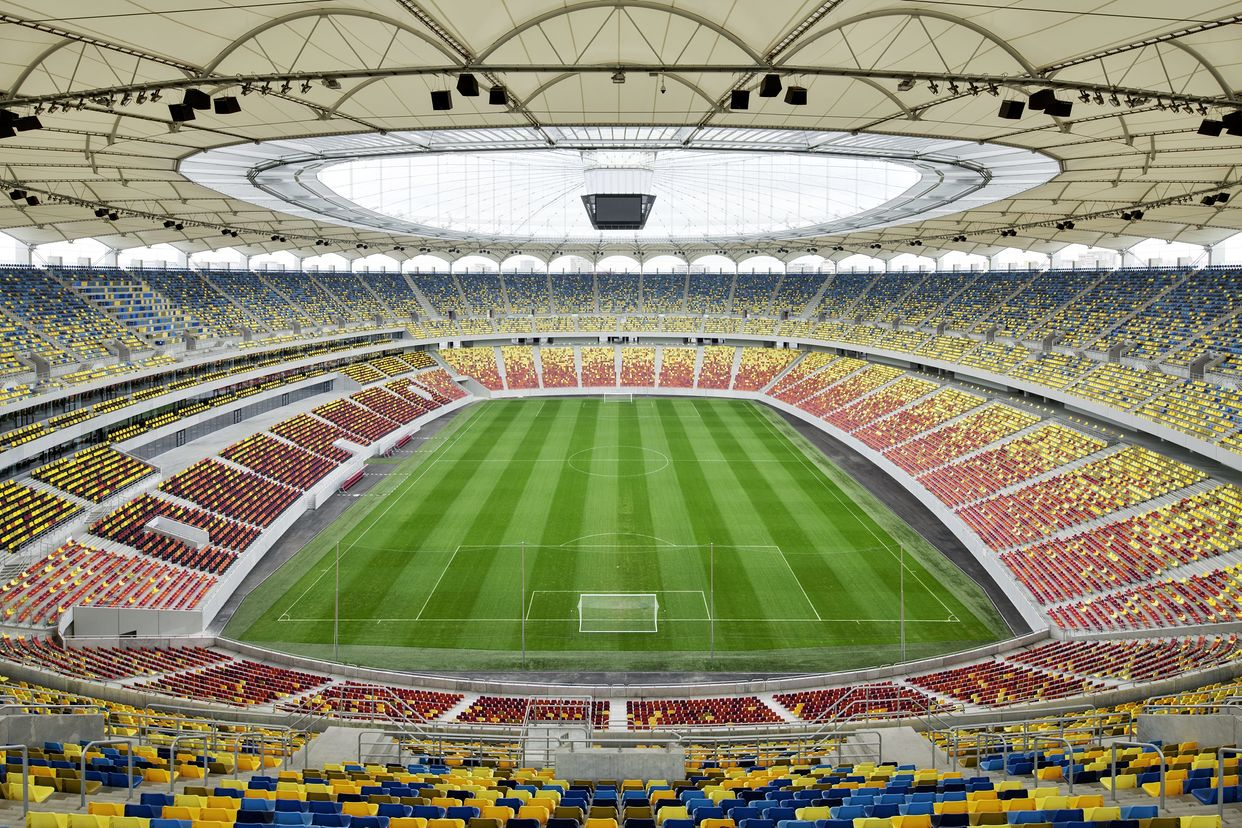
Arena Națională

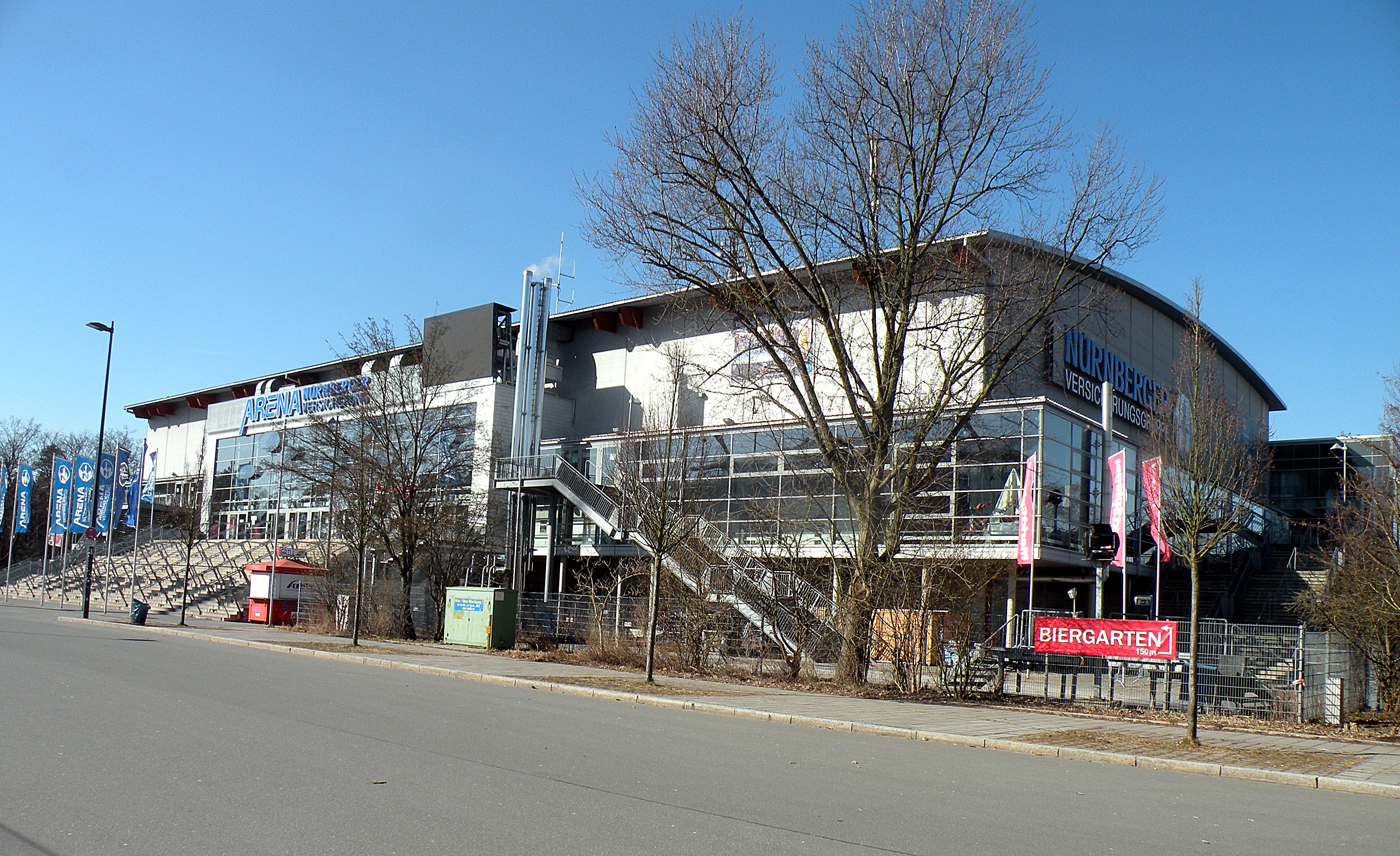
Arena Nürnberger Versicherung

Arena Sofia

Arena Stožice

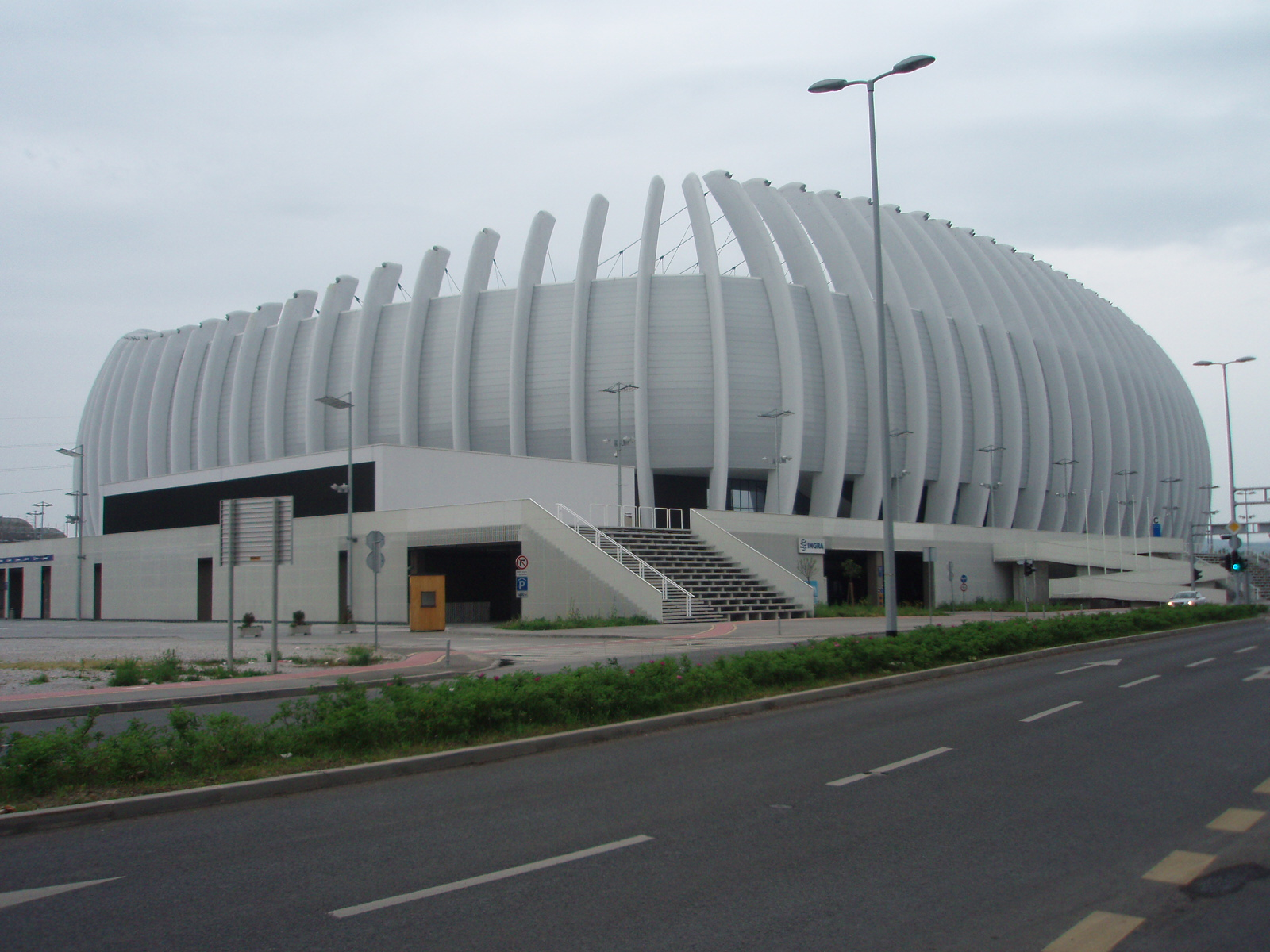
Arena Zagreb

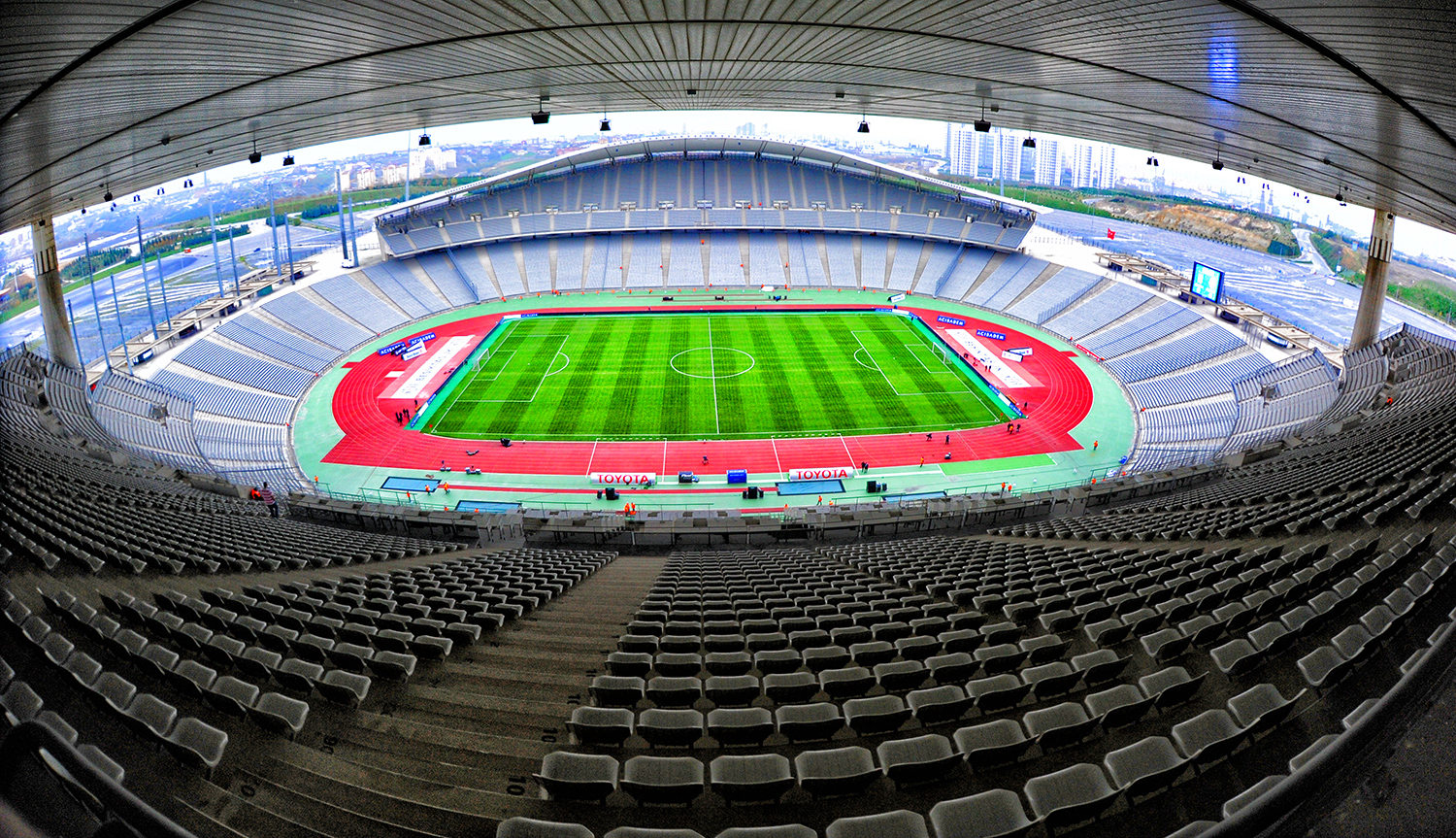
Atatürk Olympic Stadium

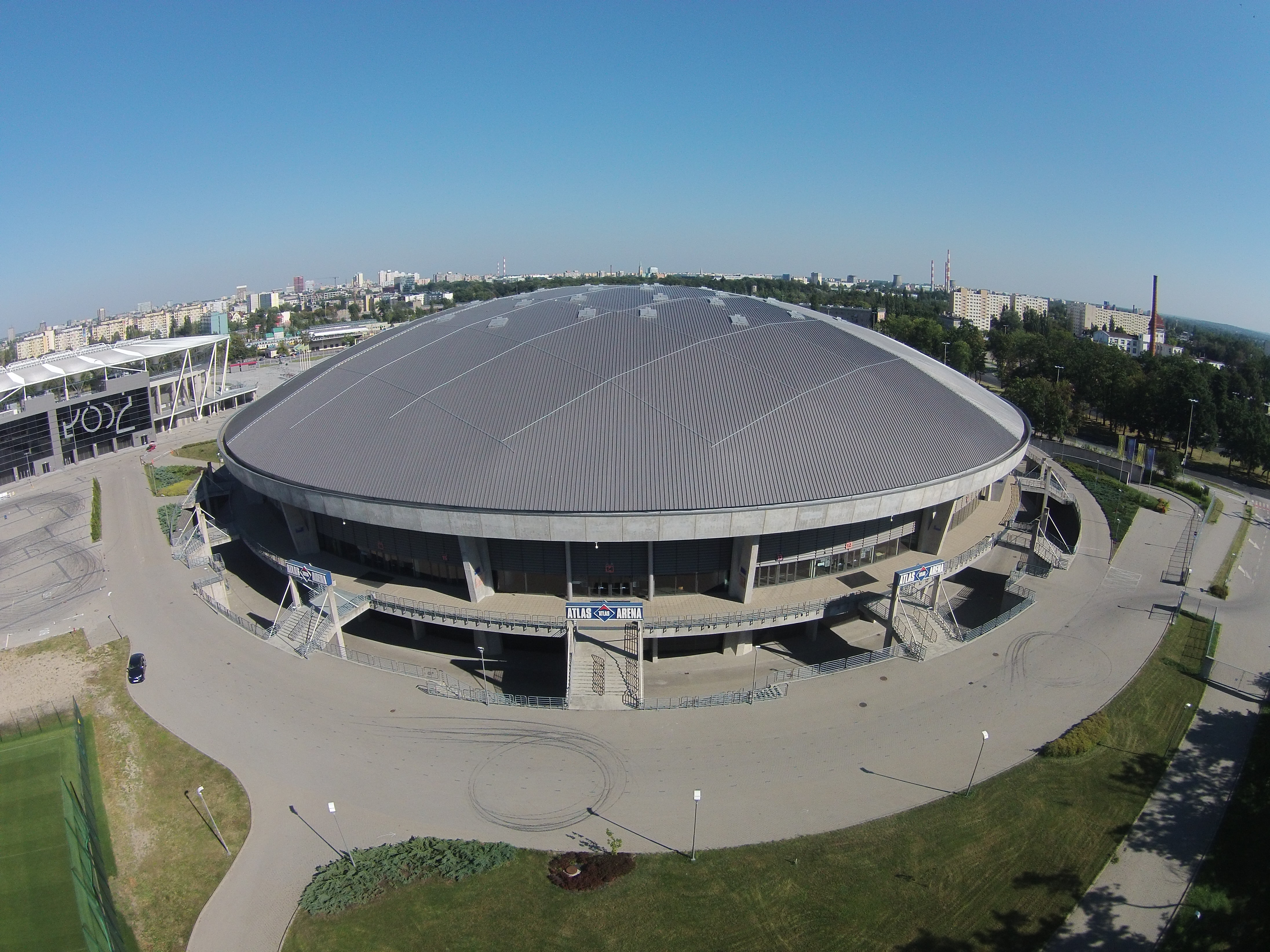
Atlas Arena

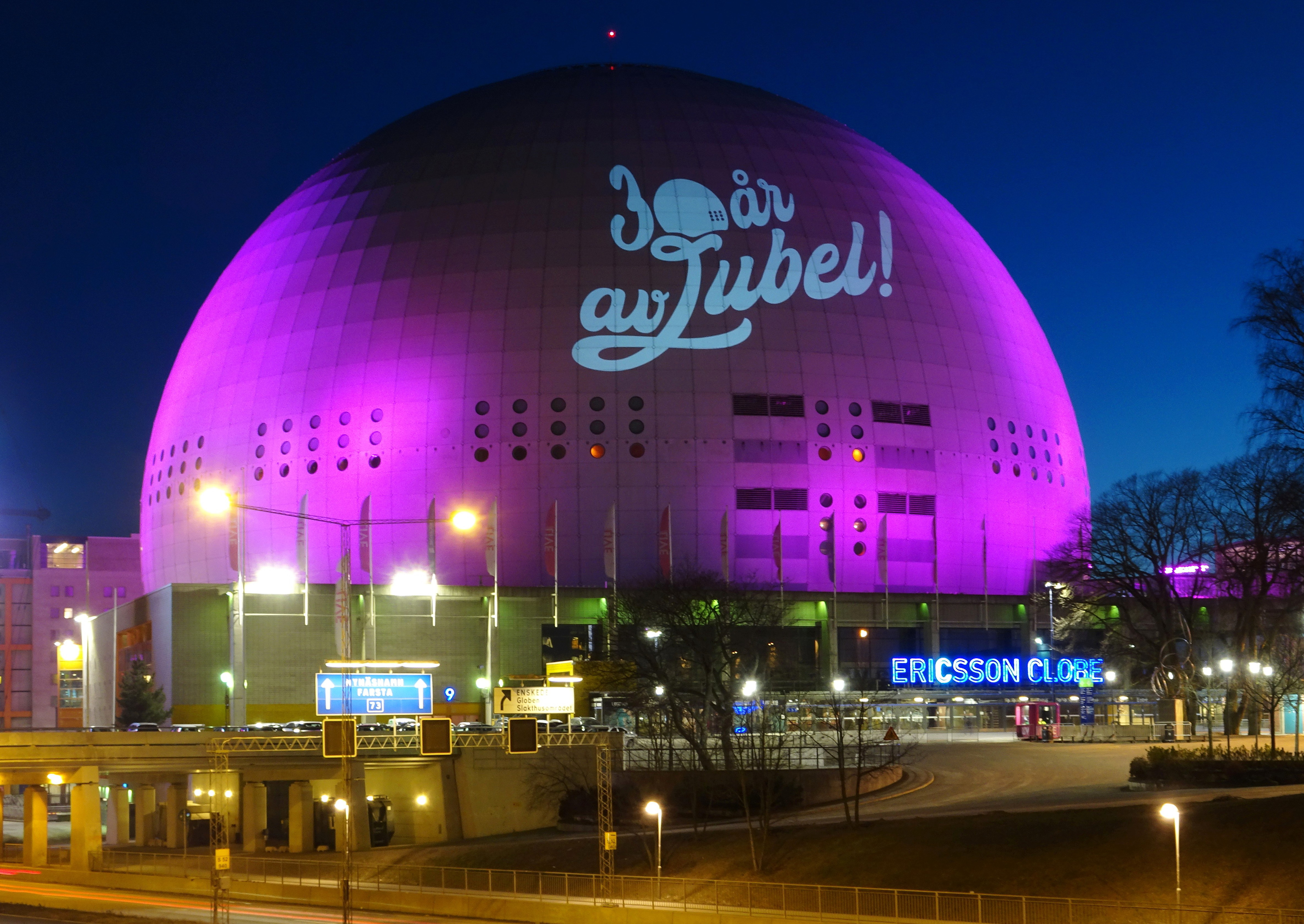
Avicii Arena

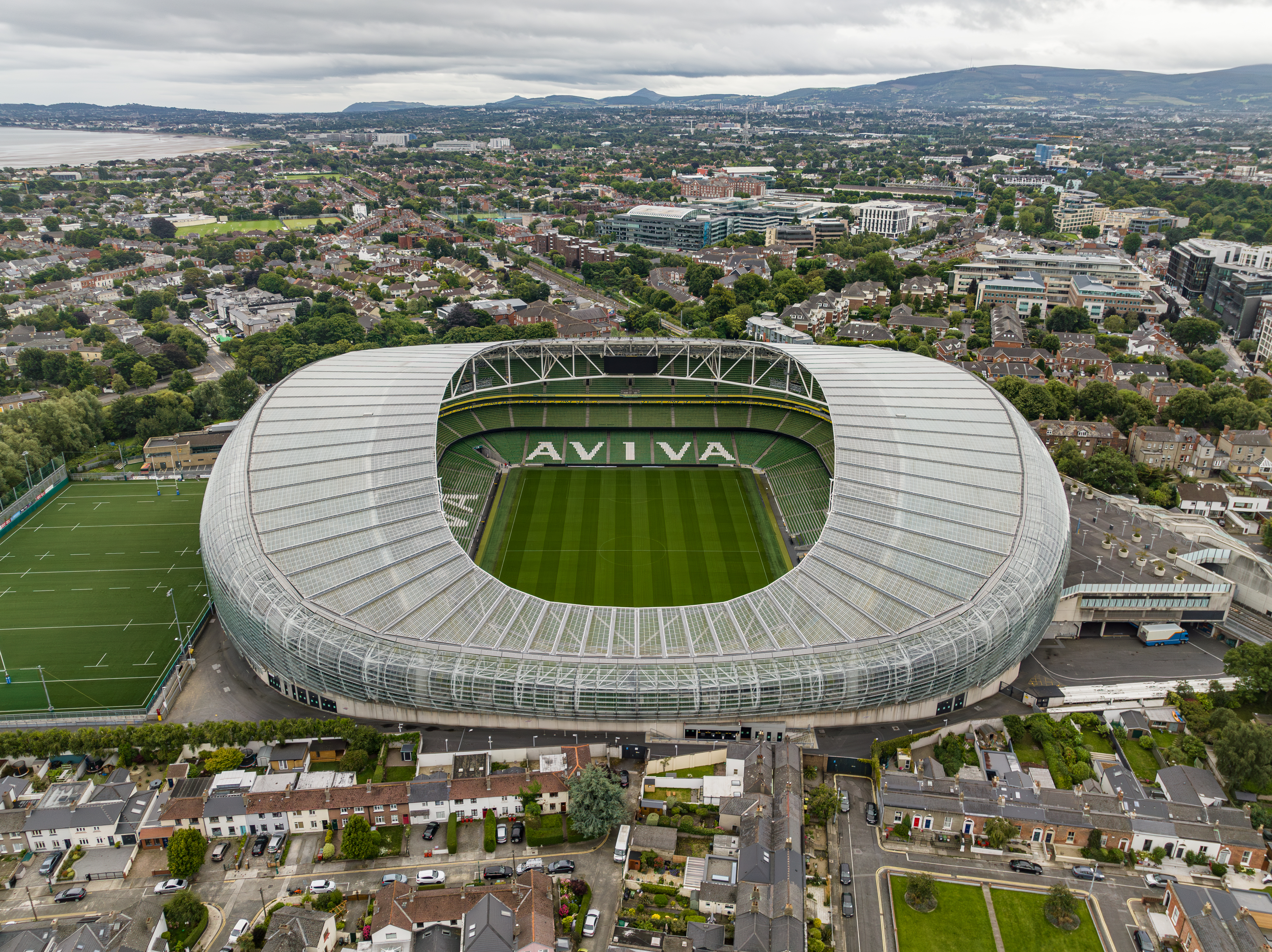
Aviva Stadium

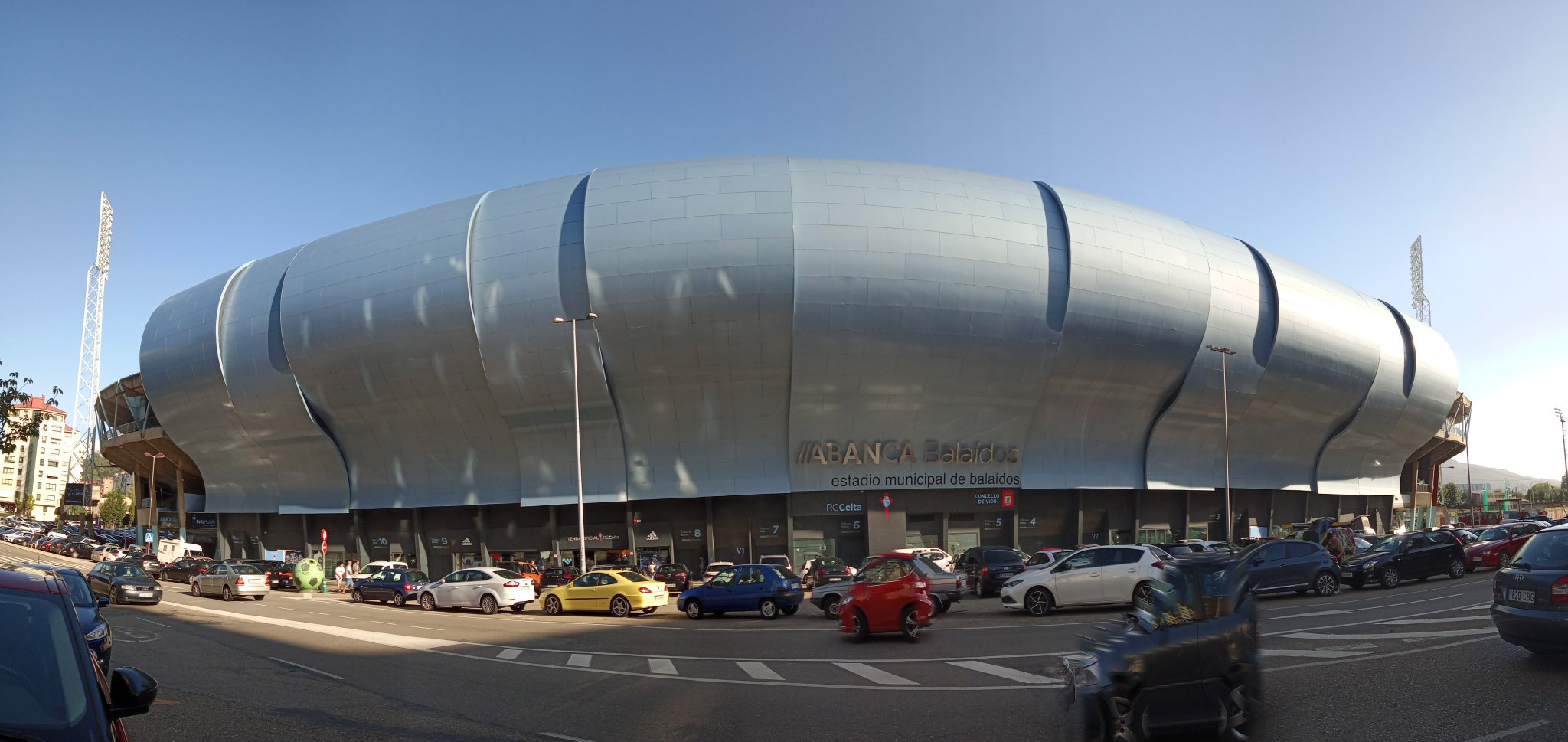
Balaídos

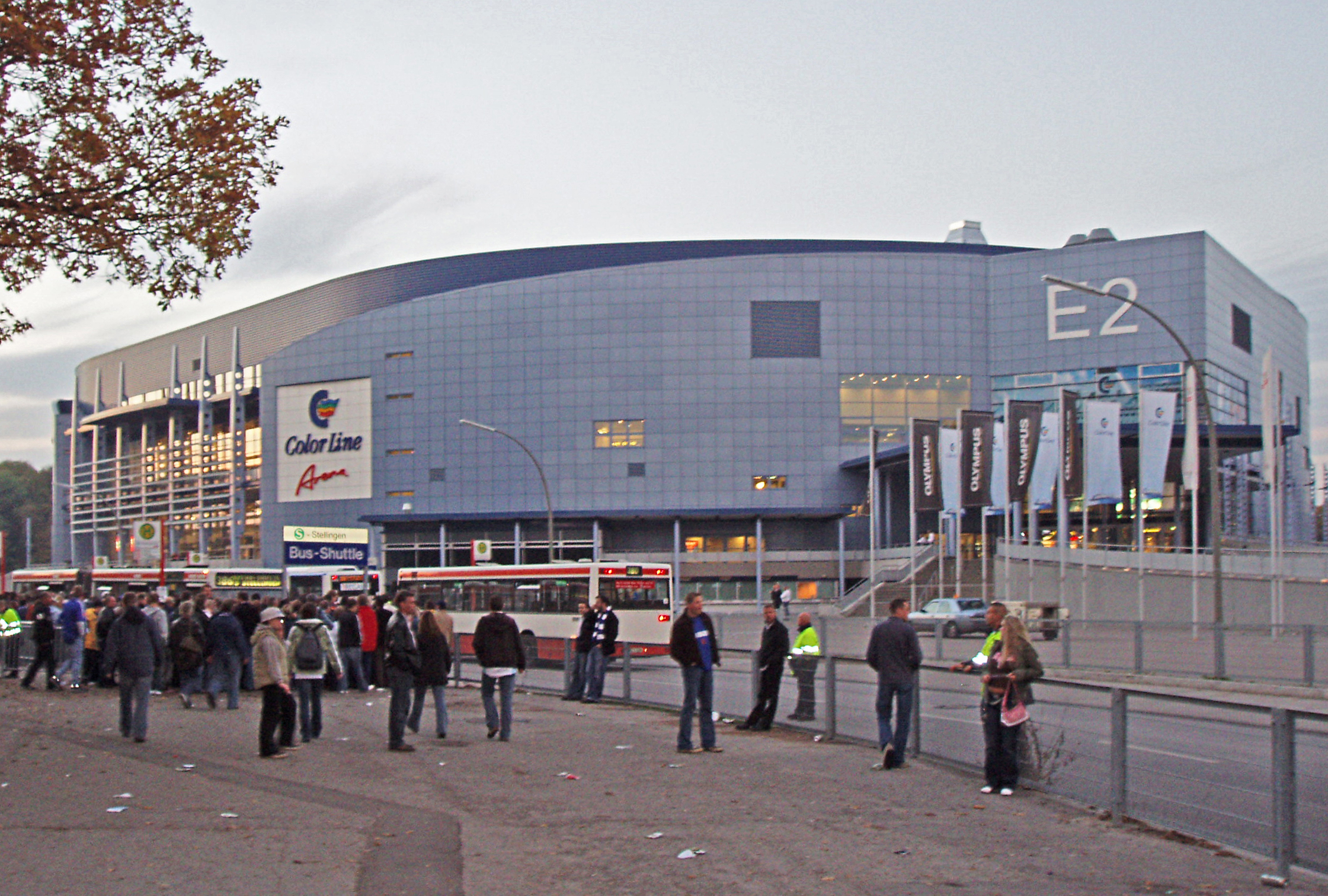
Barclays Arena

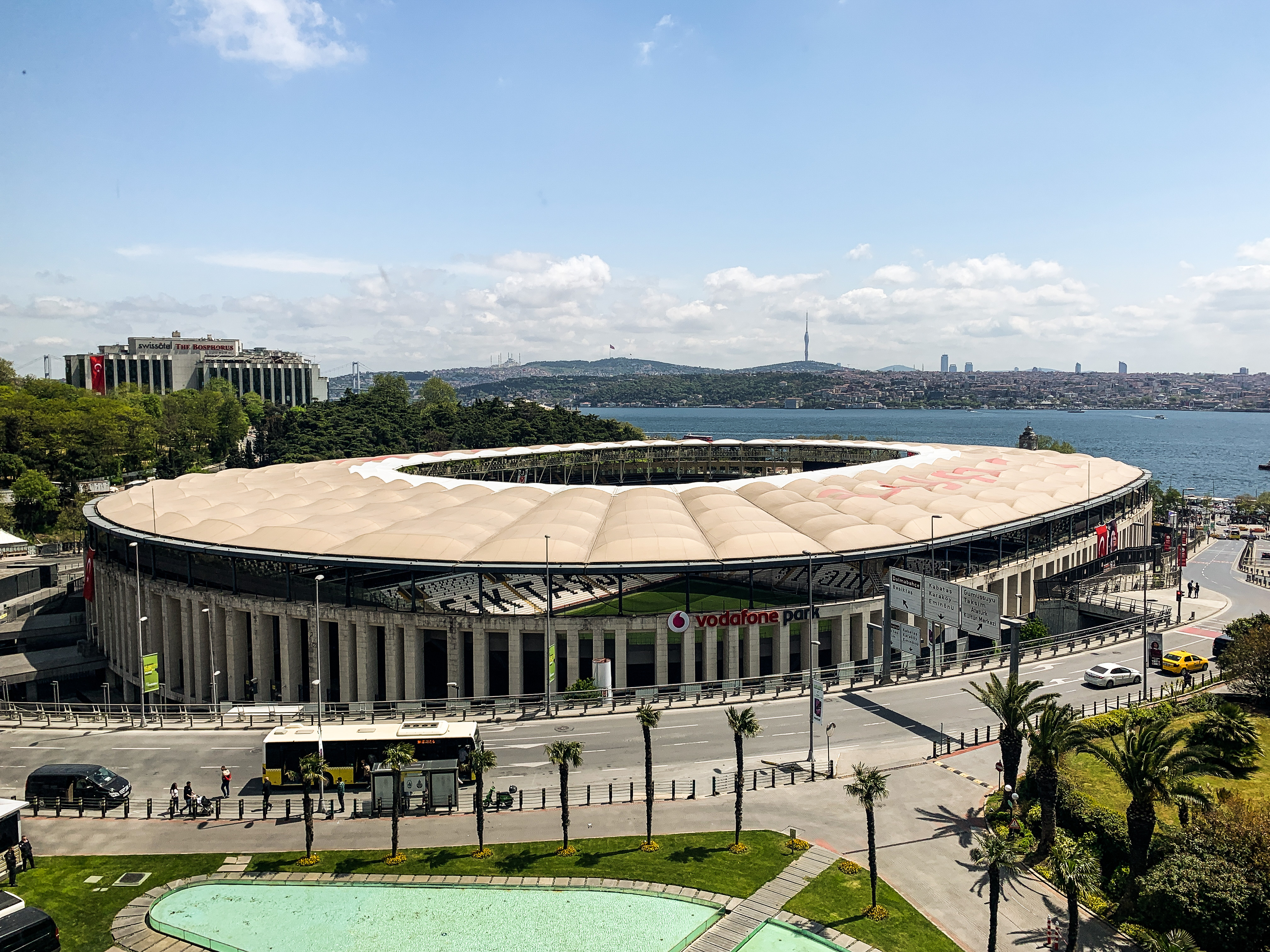
Beşiktaş Stadium

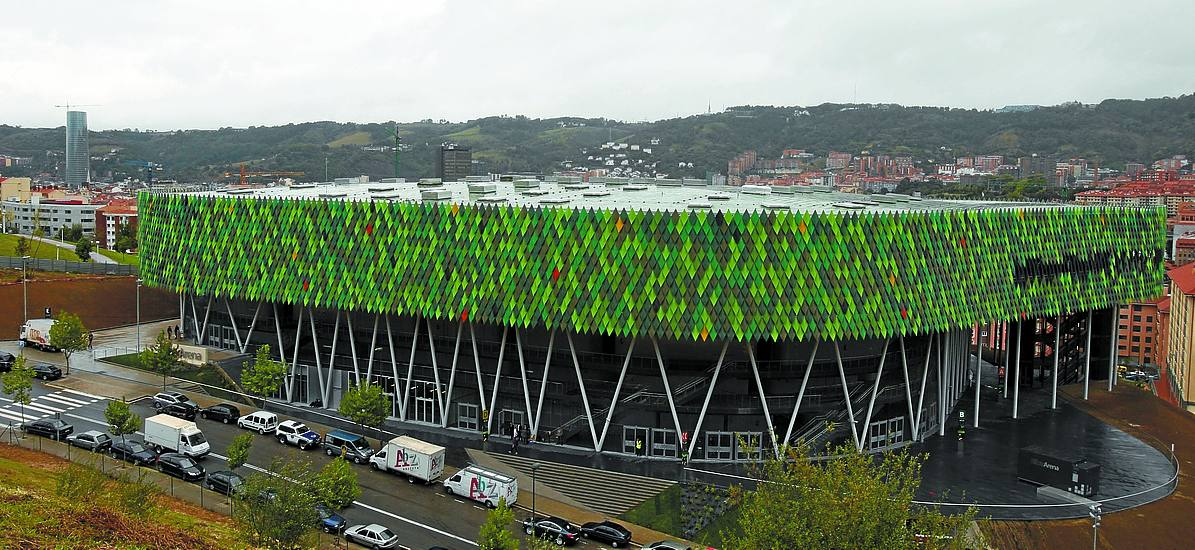
Bilbao Arena

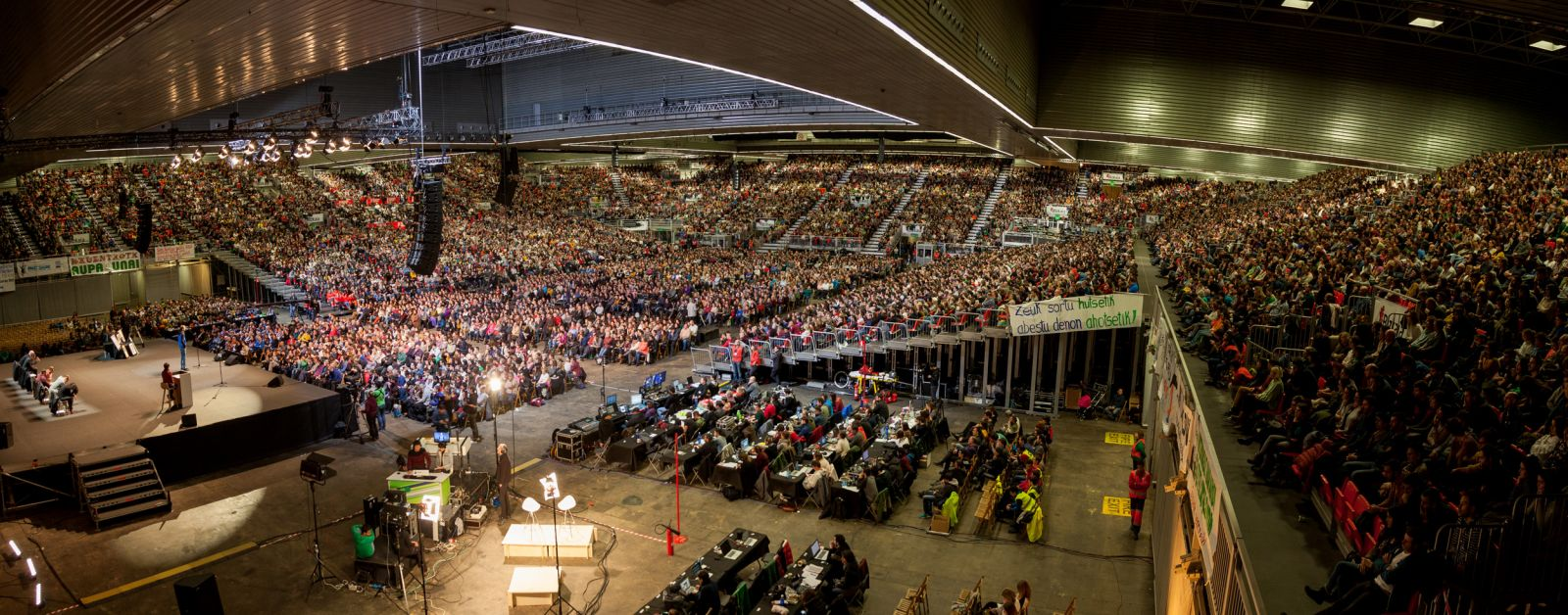
Bizkaia Arena

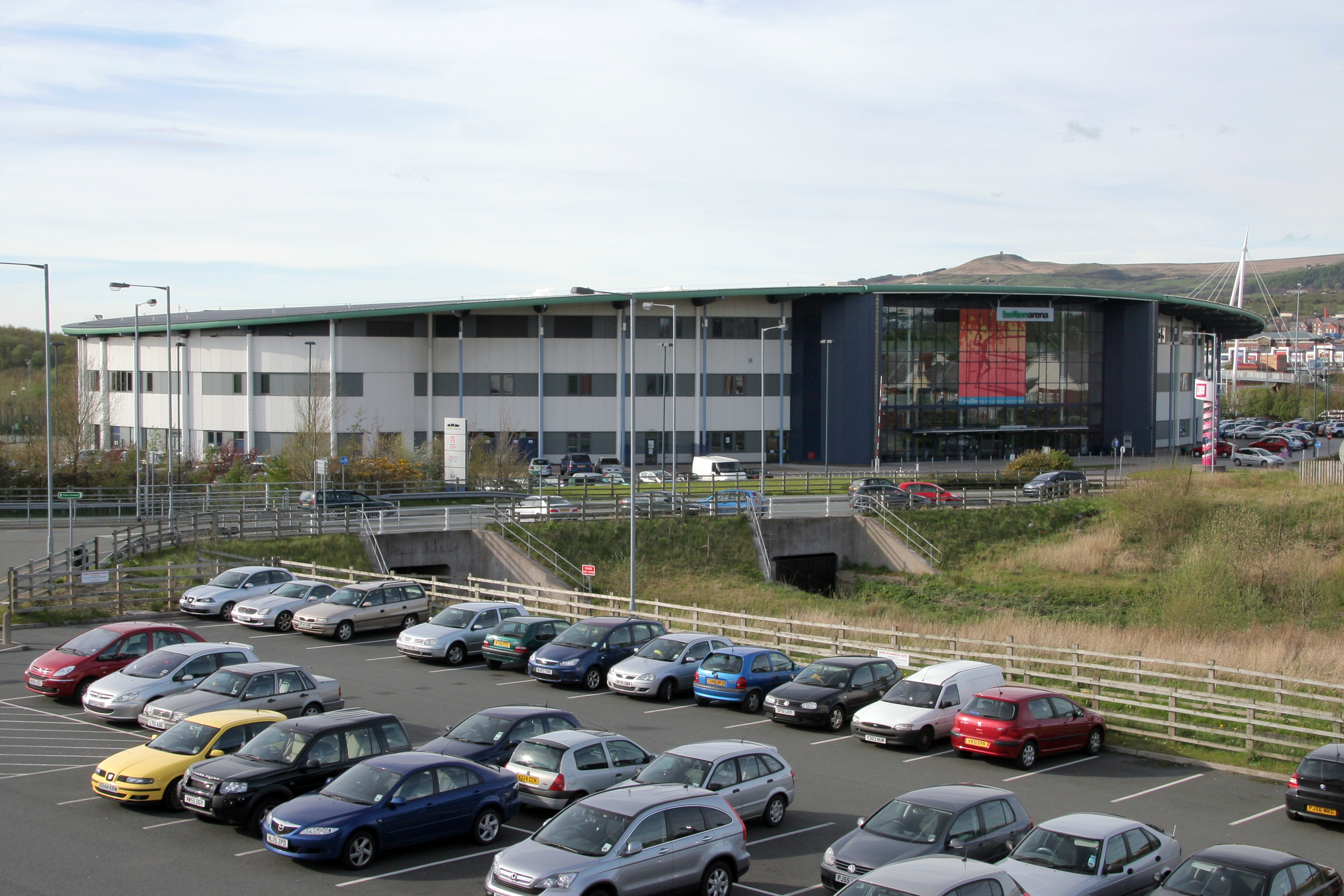
Bolton Arena

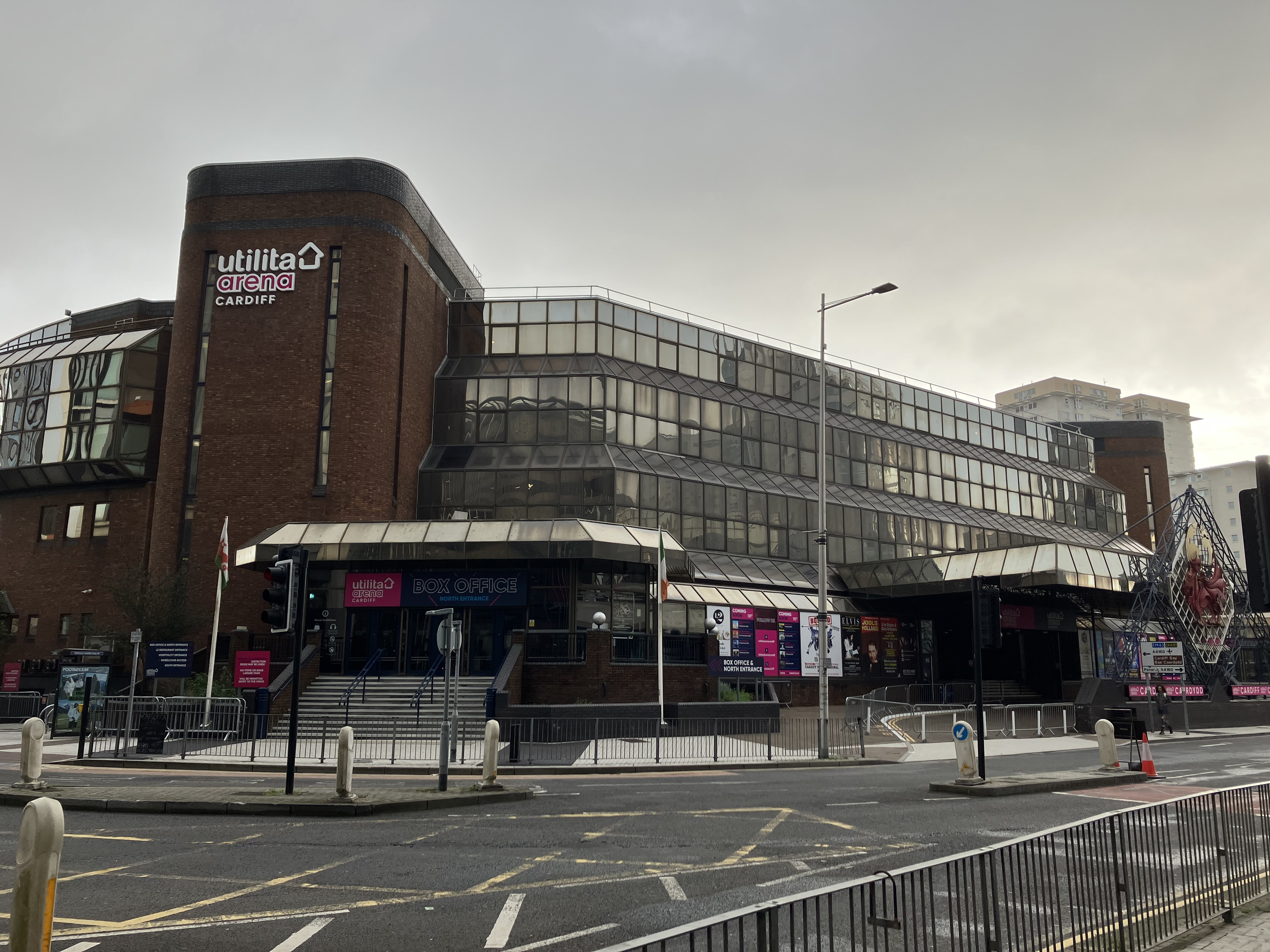
Cardiff International Arena

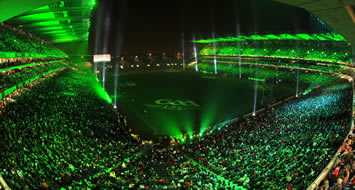
Croke Park

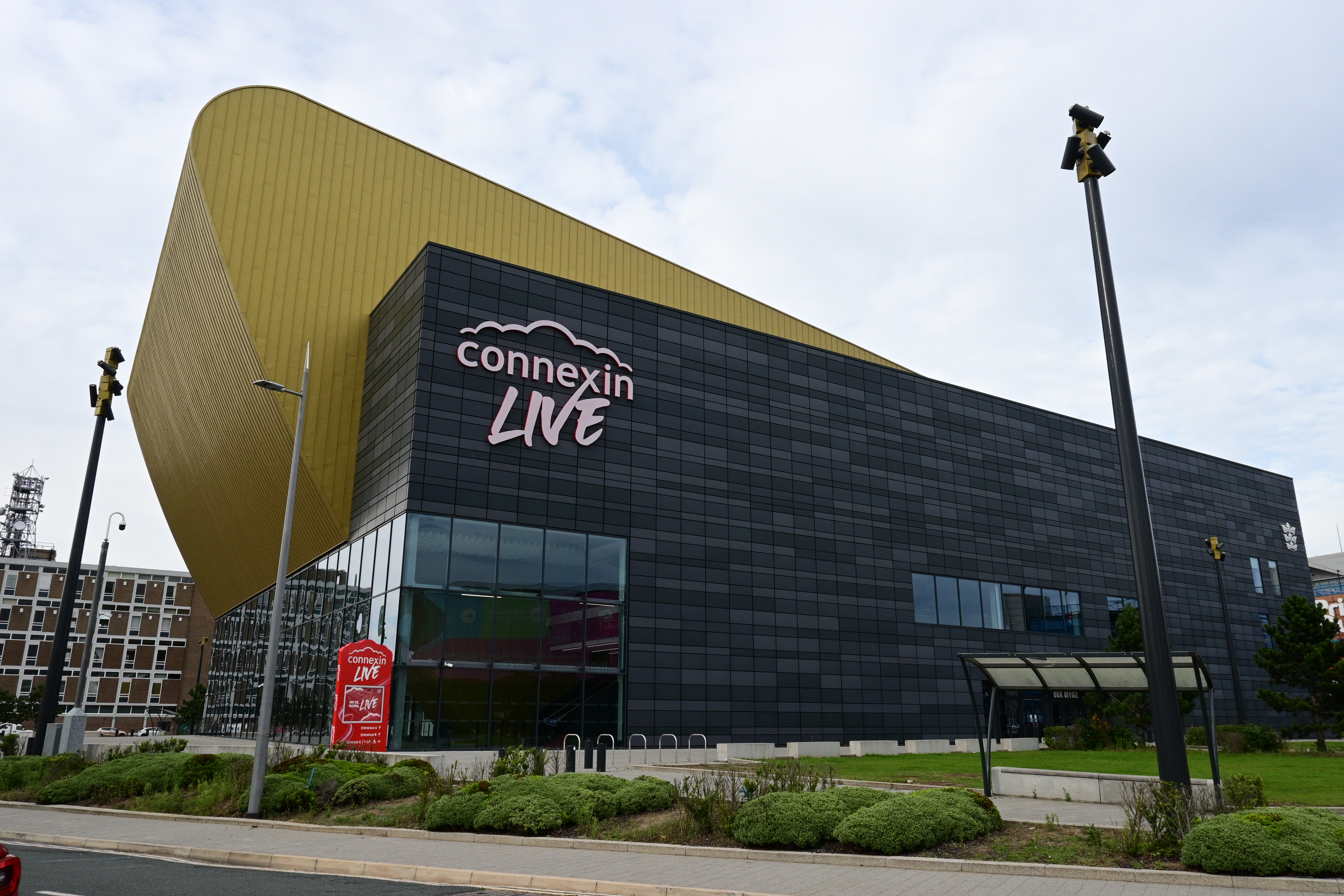
Connexin Live Arena

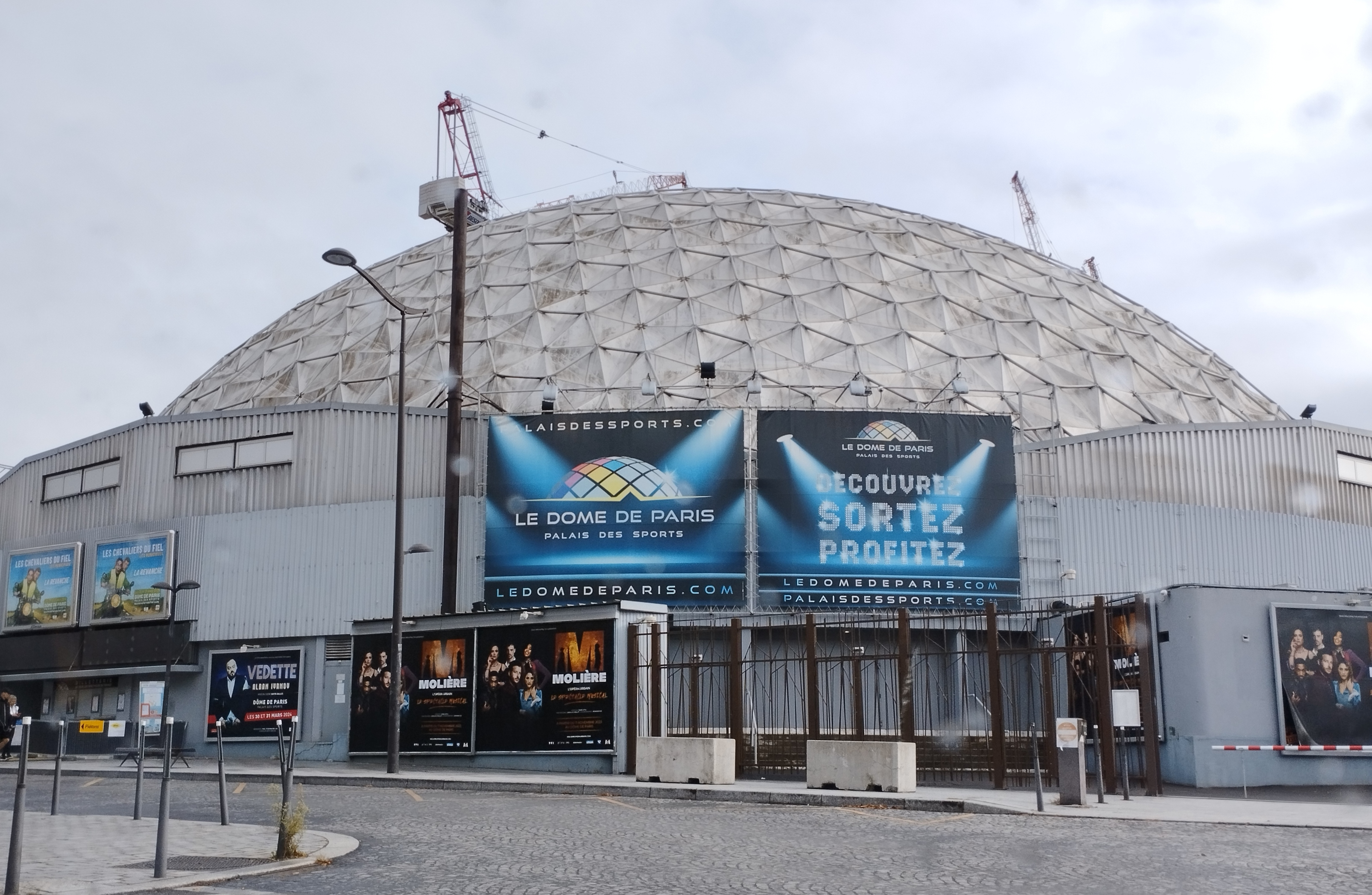
Dôme de Paris

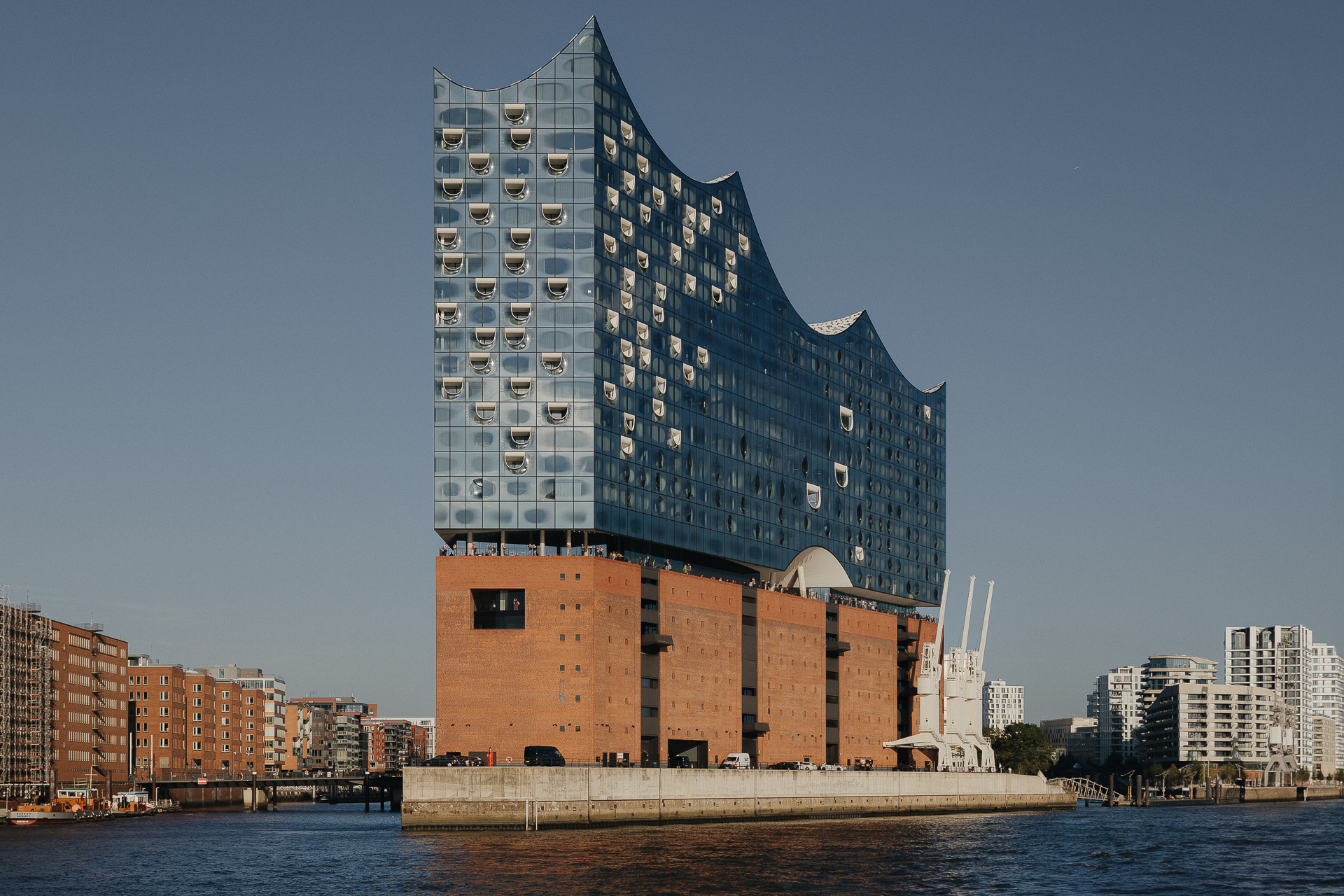
Elbphilharmonie

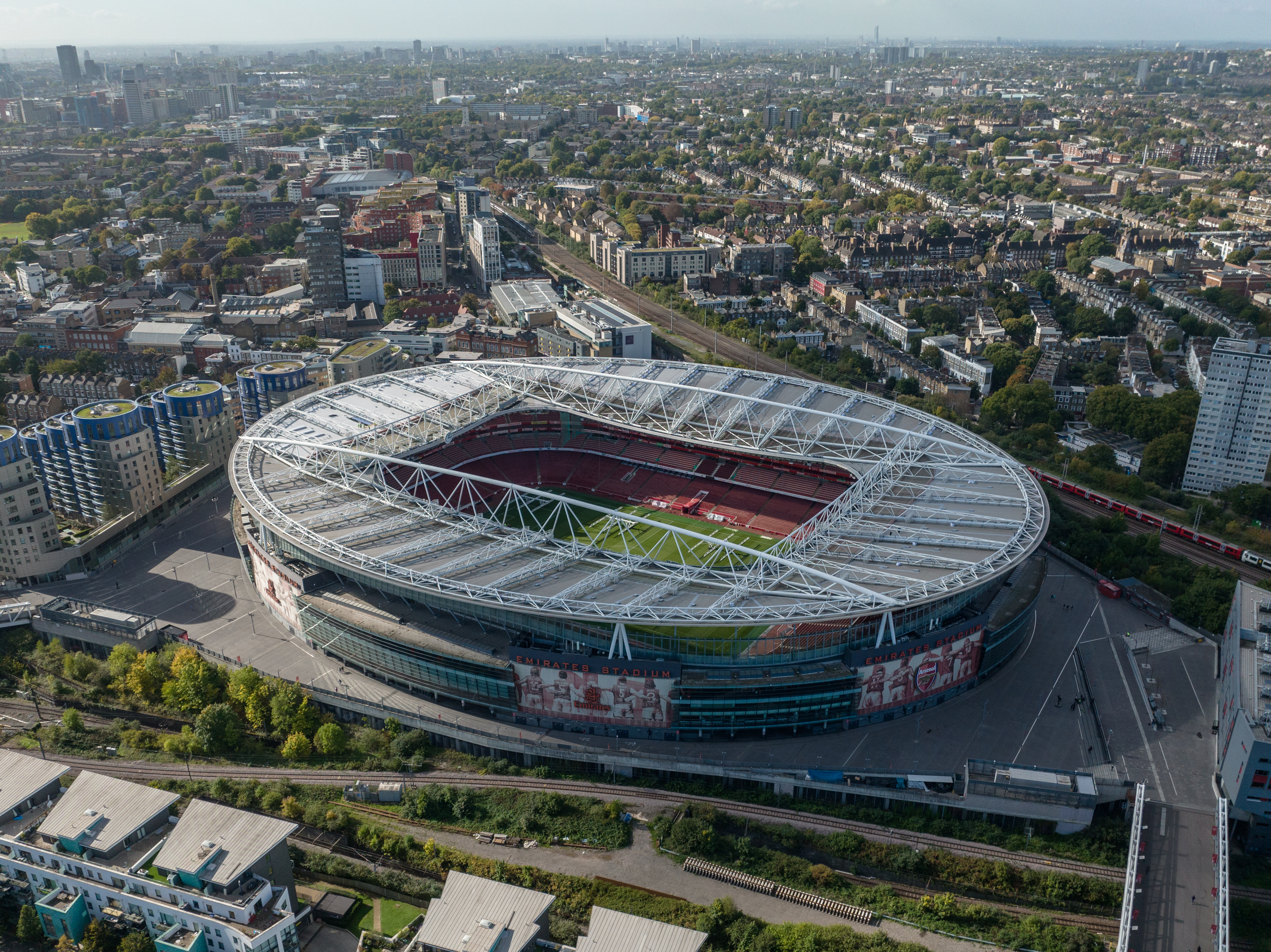
Emirates Stadium

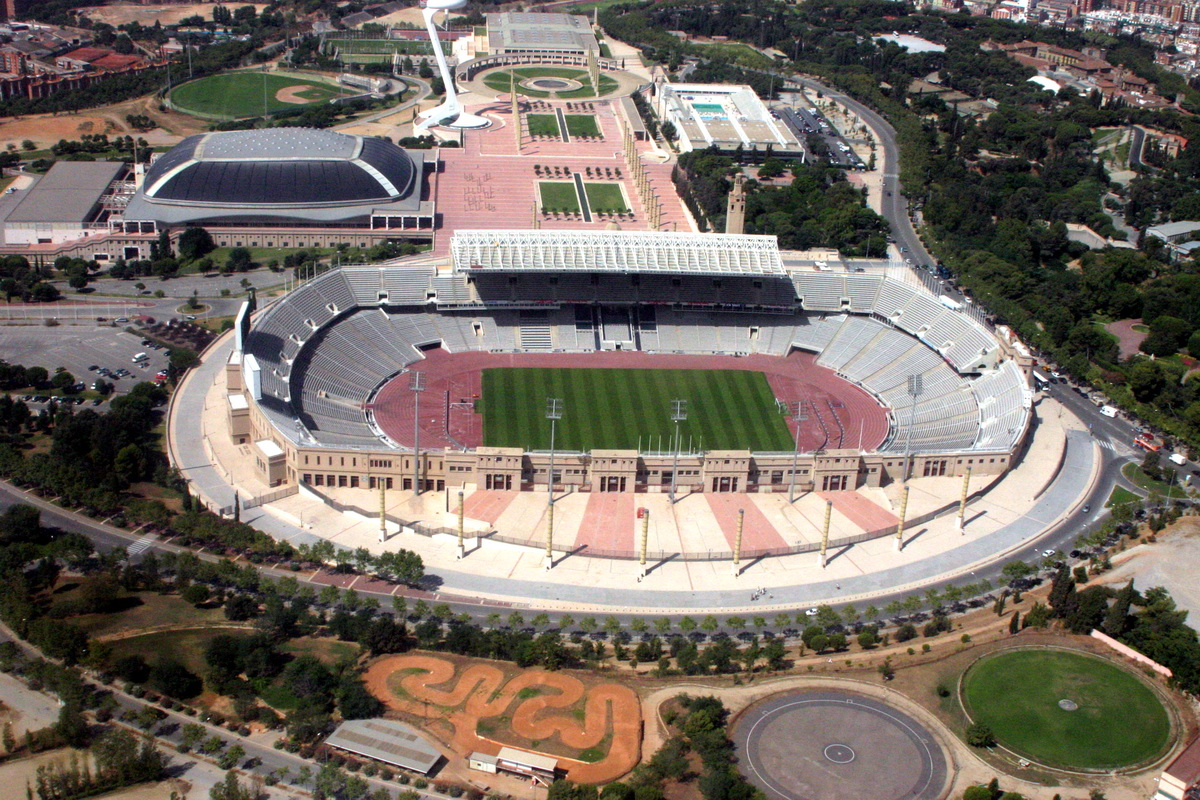
Estadi Olímpic Lluís Companys

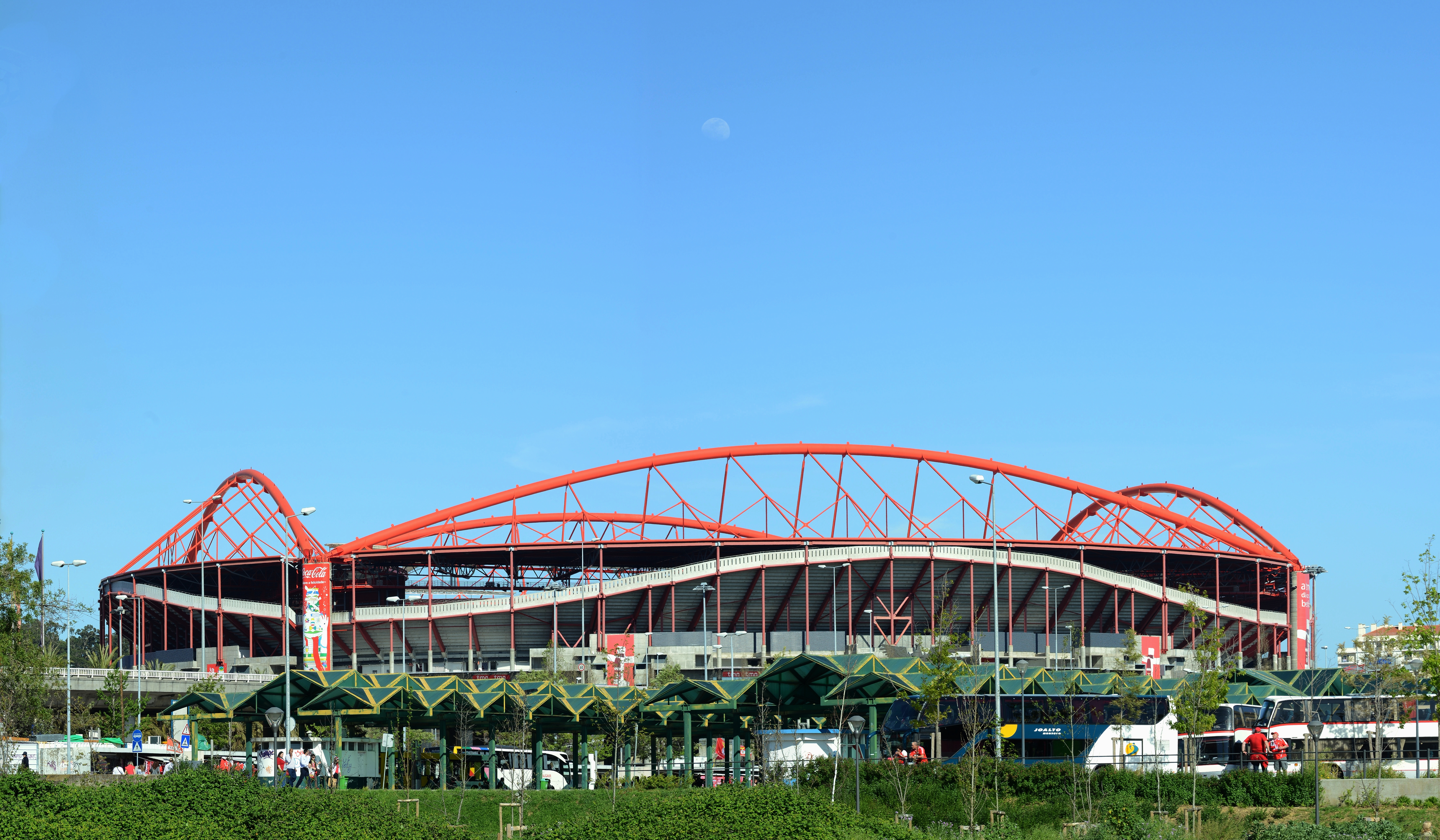
Estádio da Luz

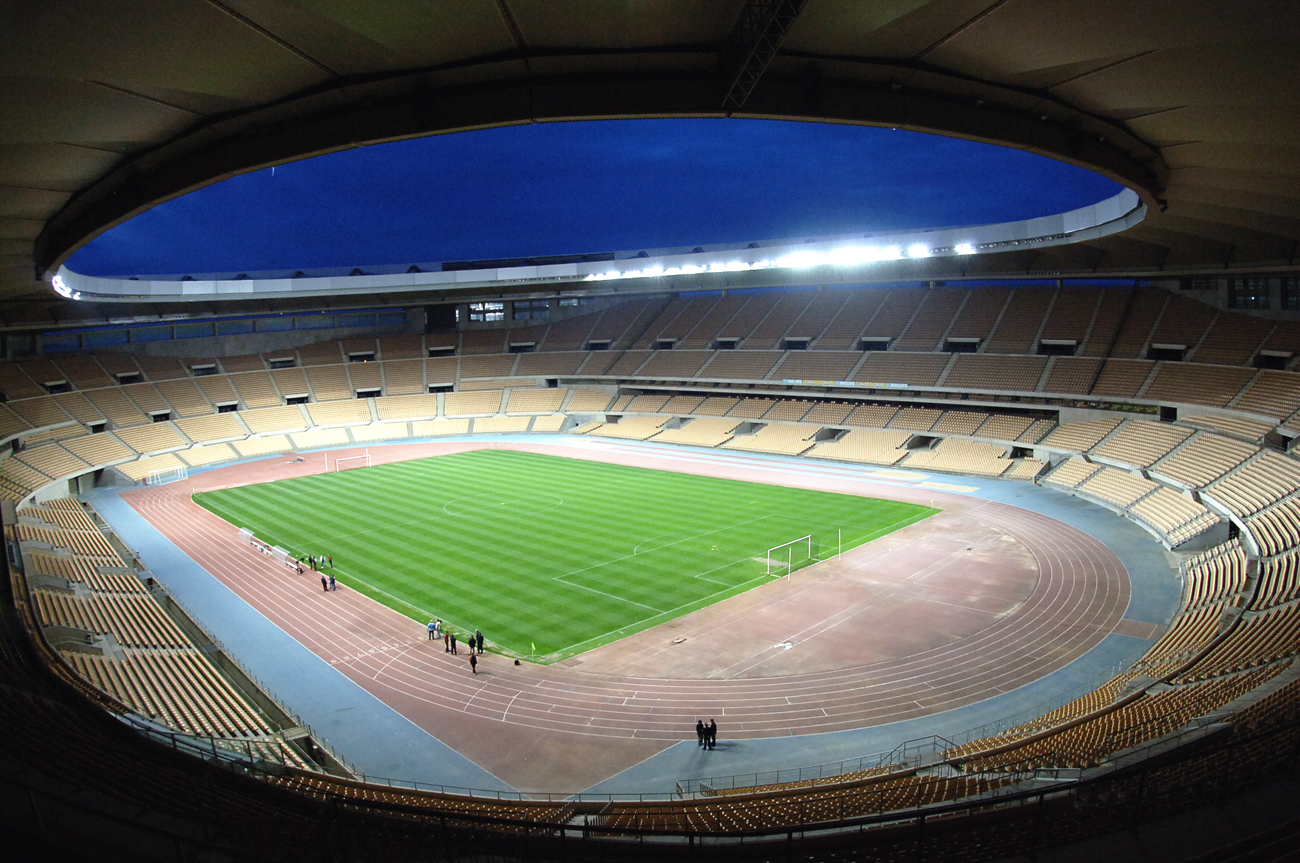
Estadio de La Cartuja

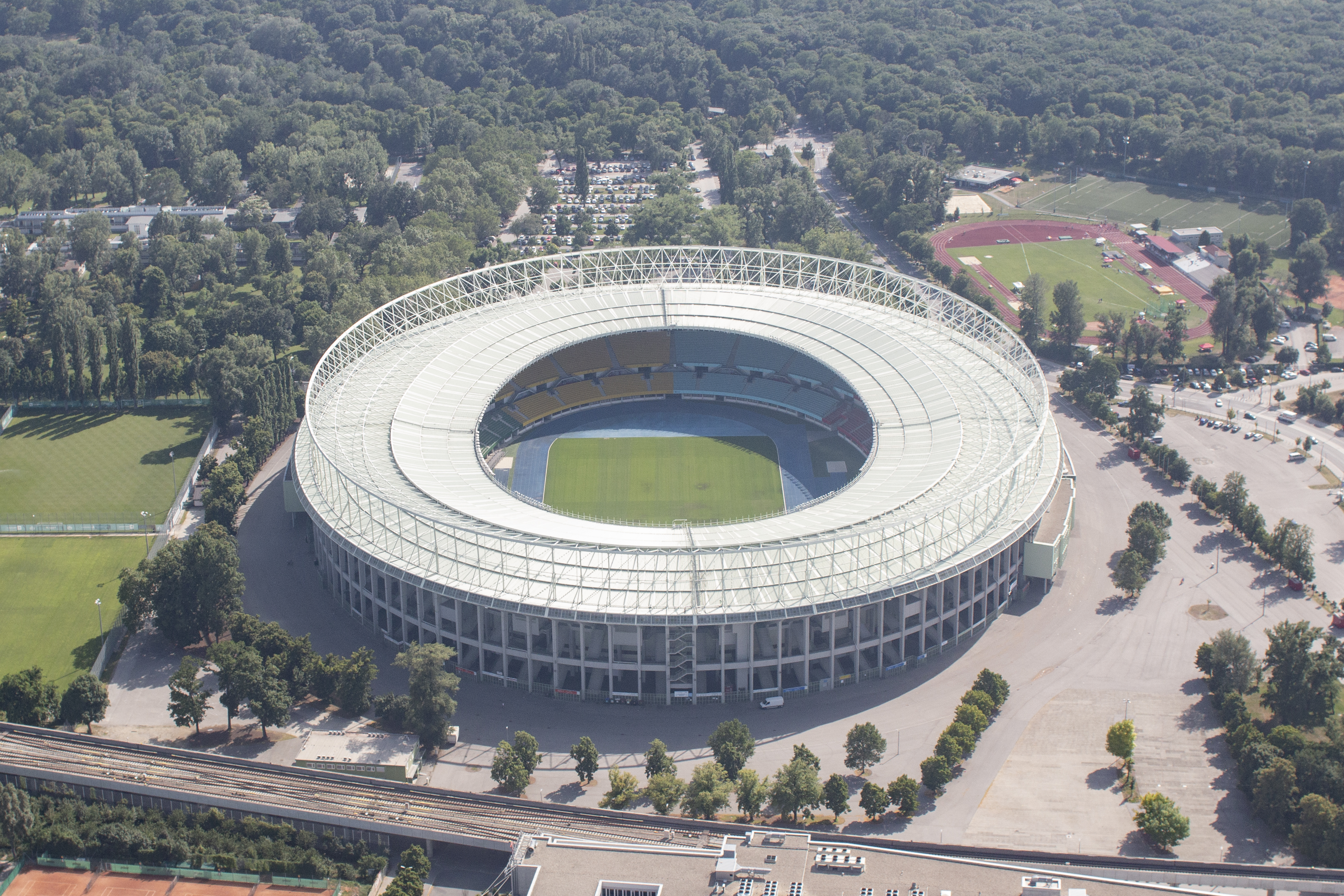
Ernst-Happel-Stadion

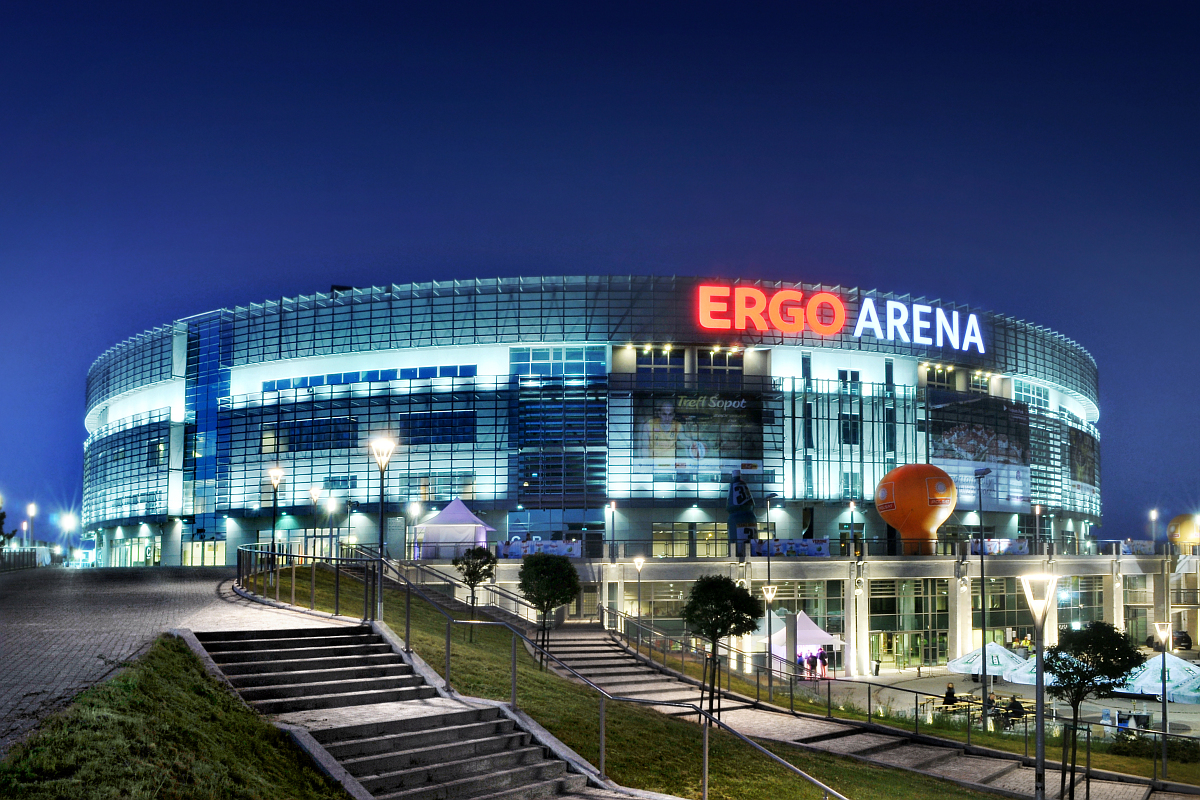
Ergo Arena

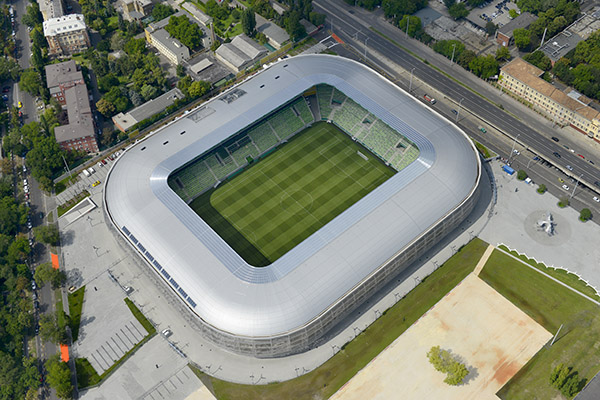
Ferencváros Stadion

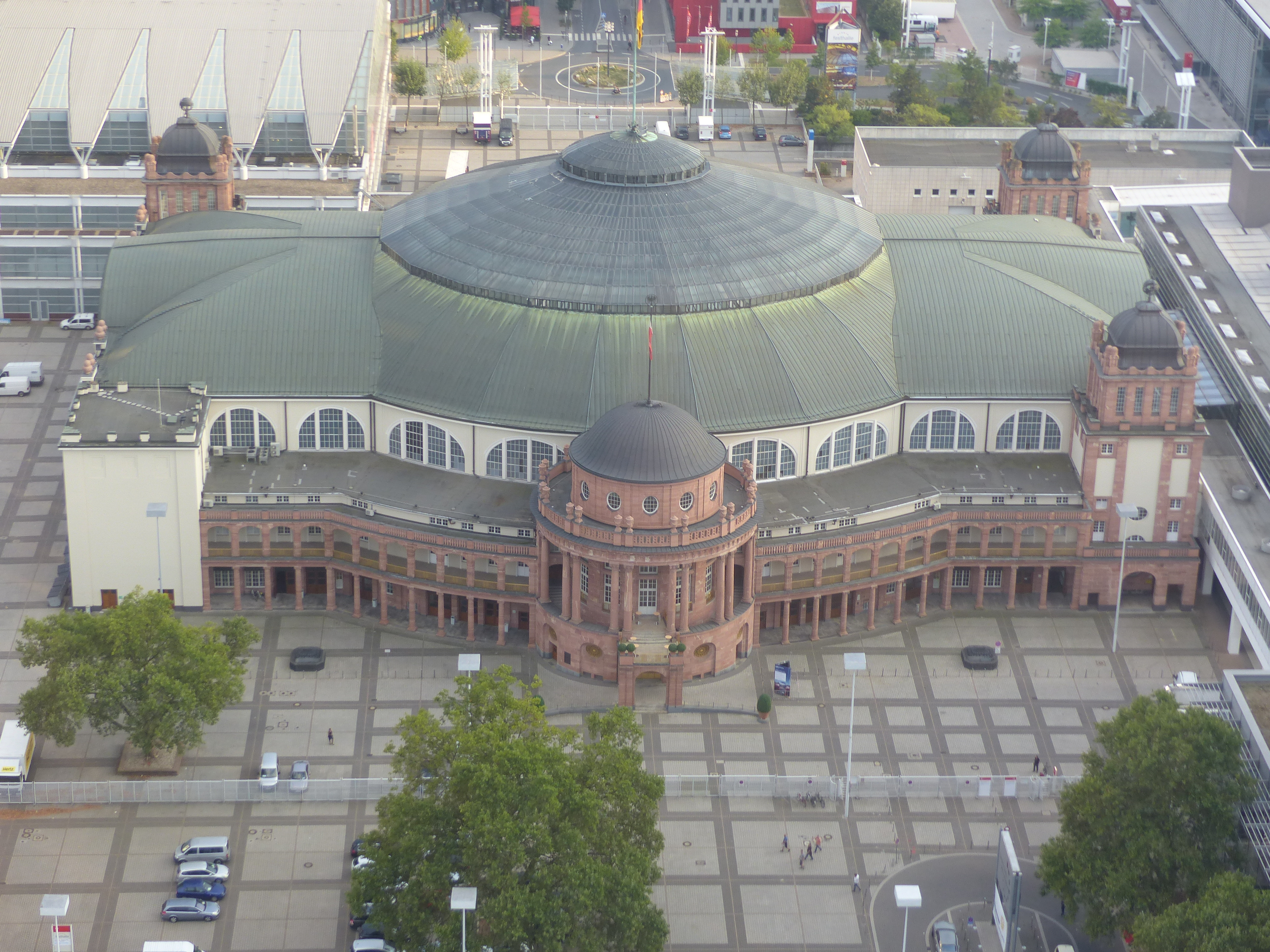
Festhalle Frankfurt

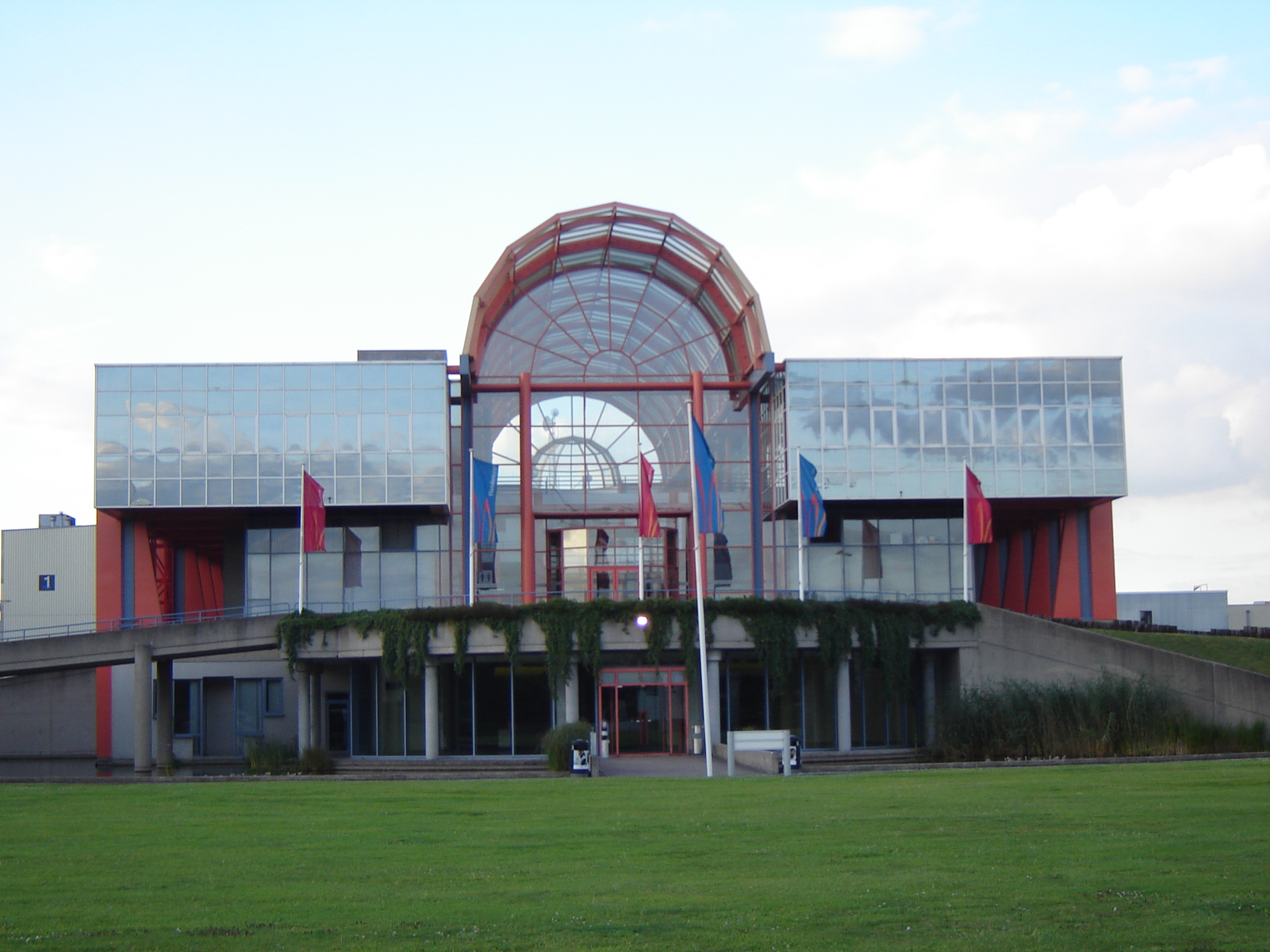
Flanders Expo

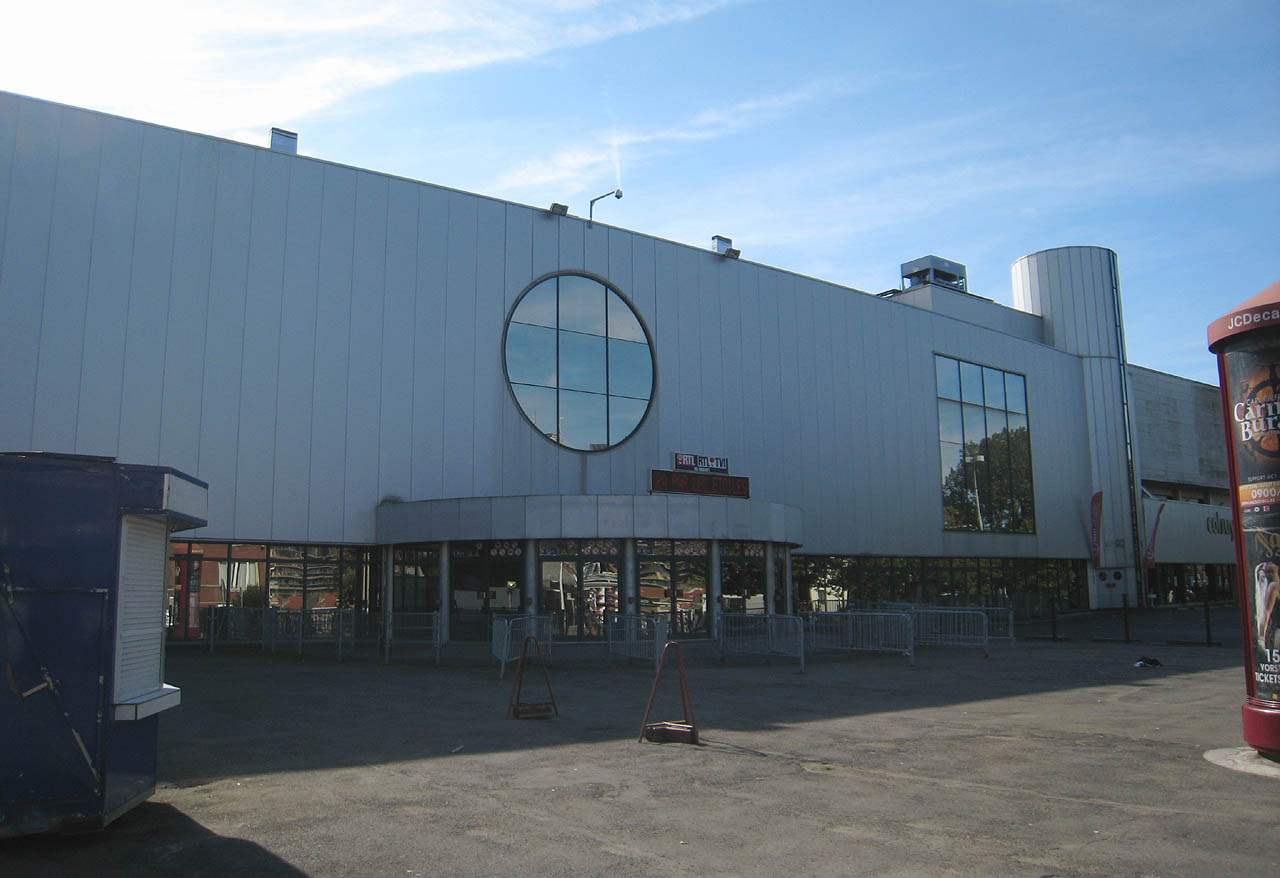
Forest National

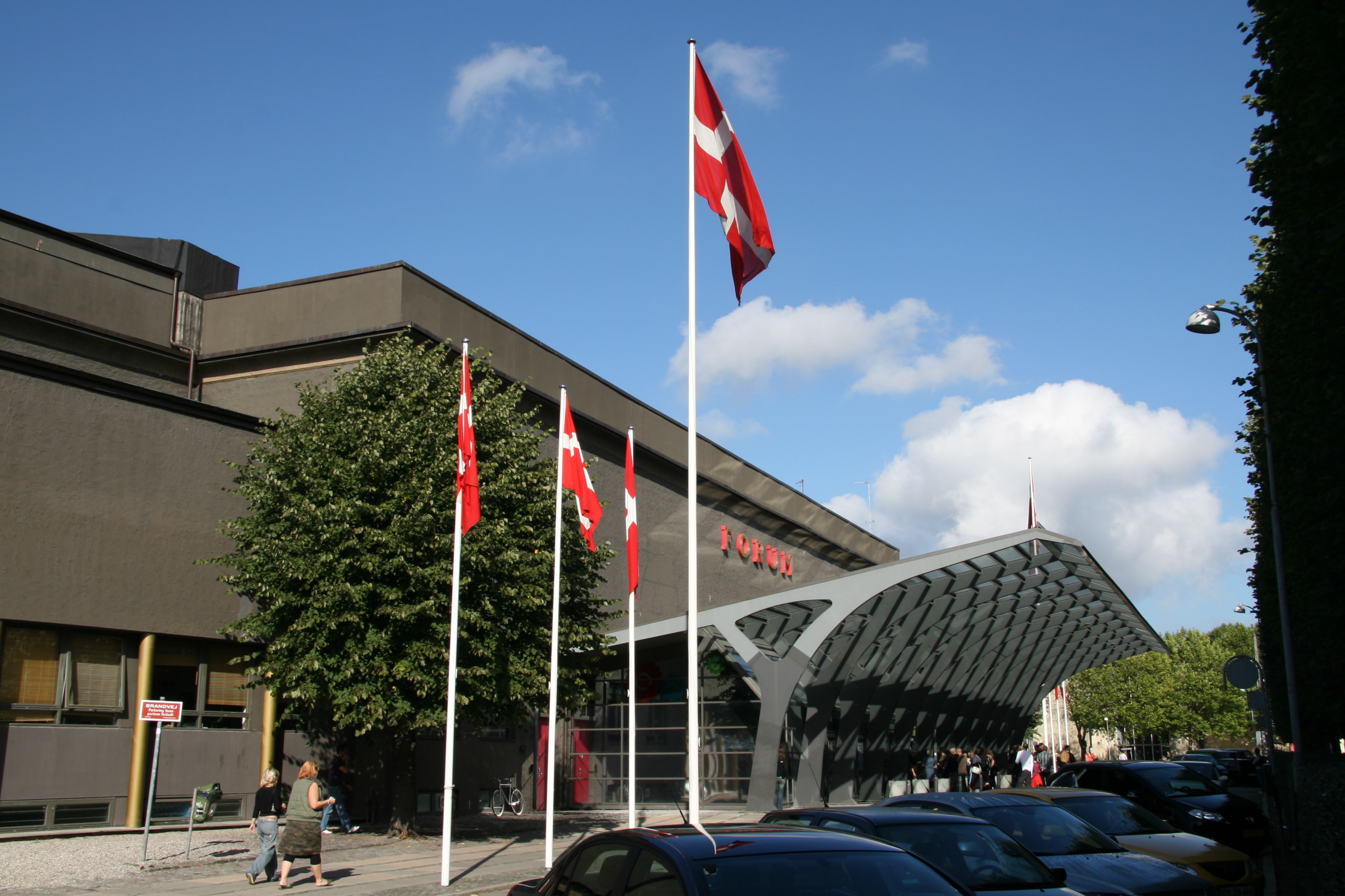
Forum Copenhagen

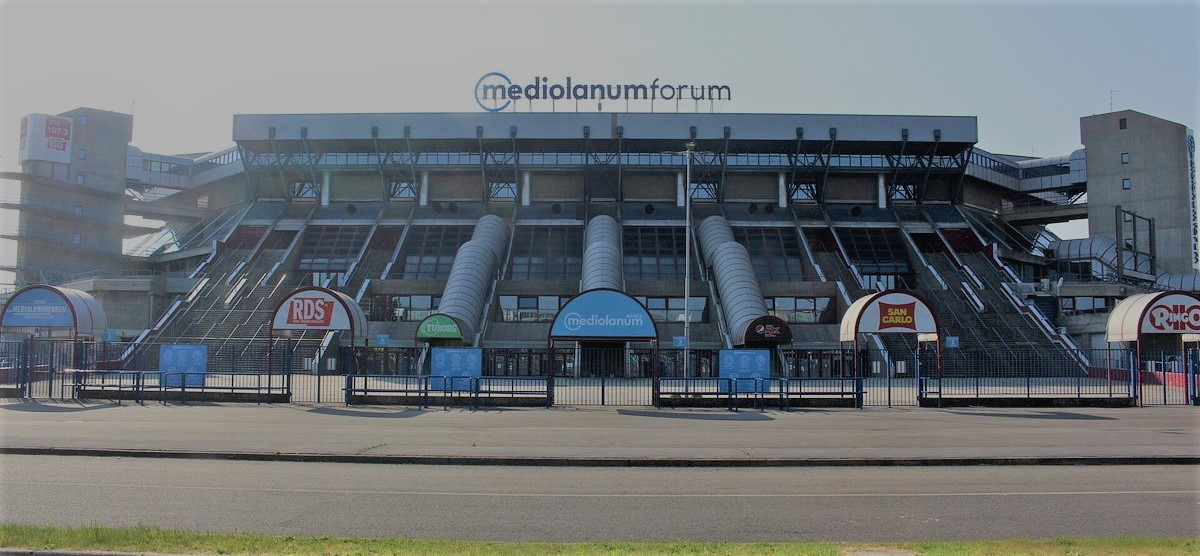
Forum di Milano

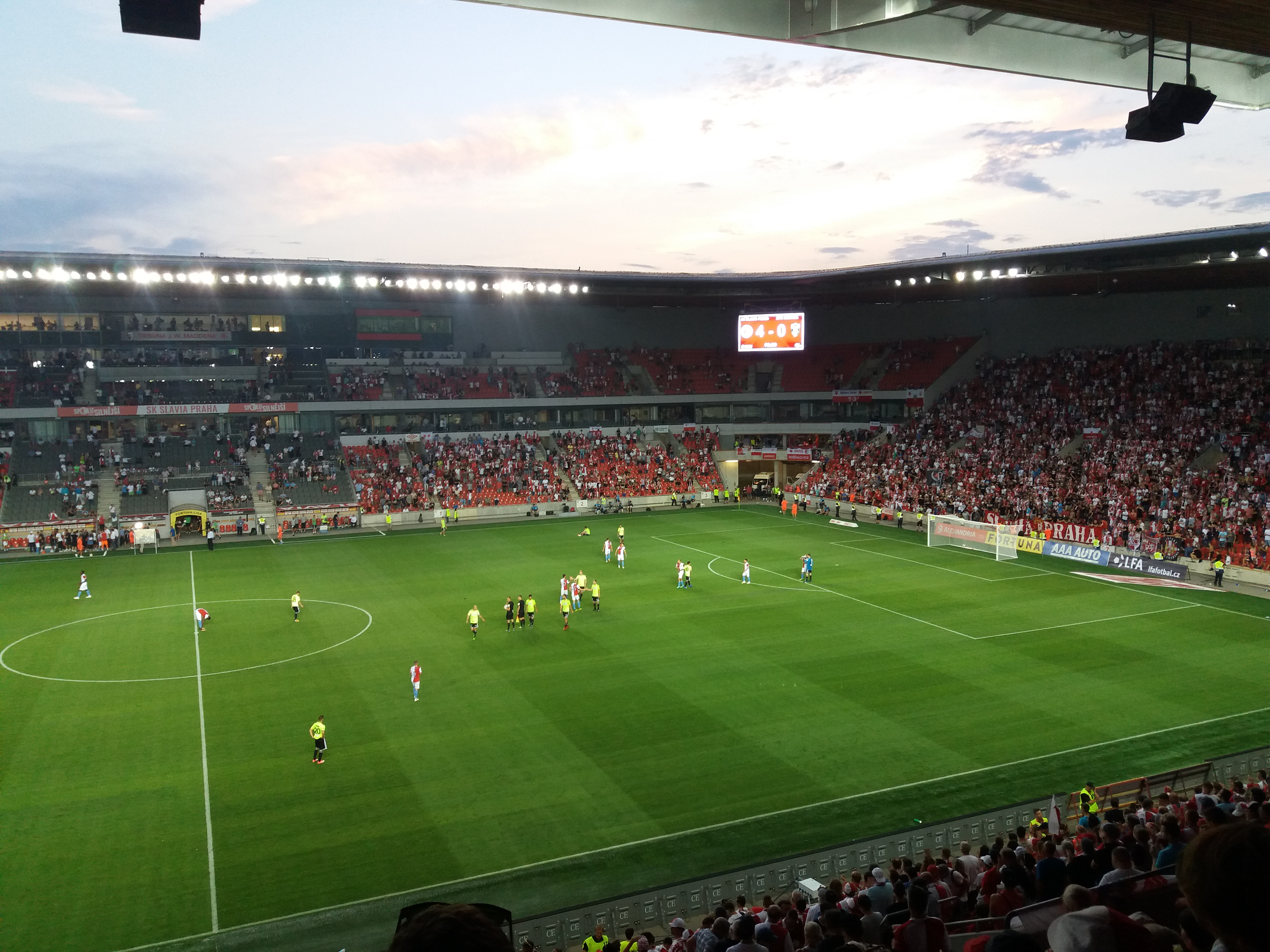
Fortuna Arena

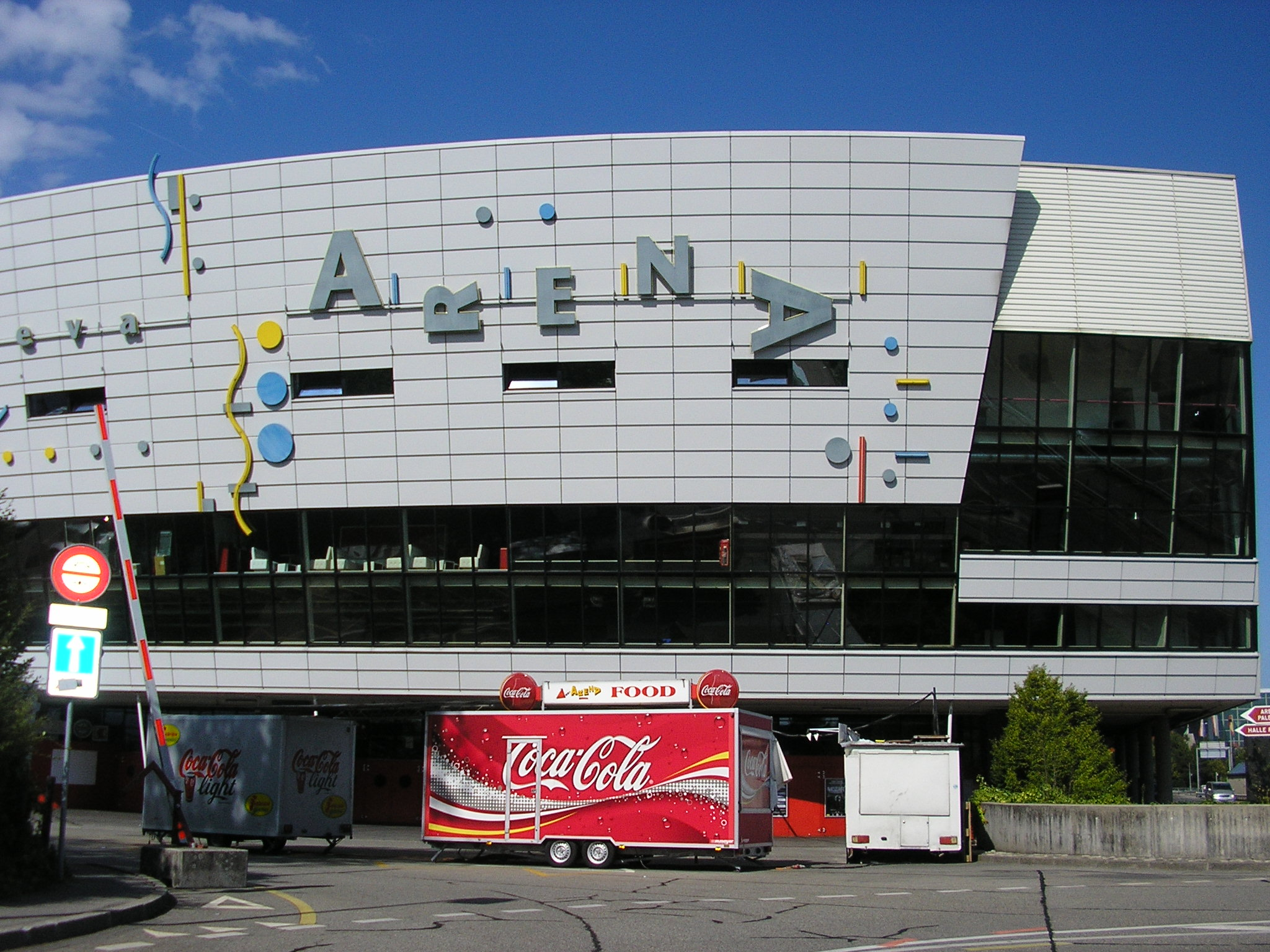
Geneva Arena

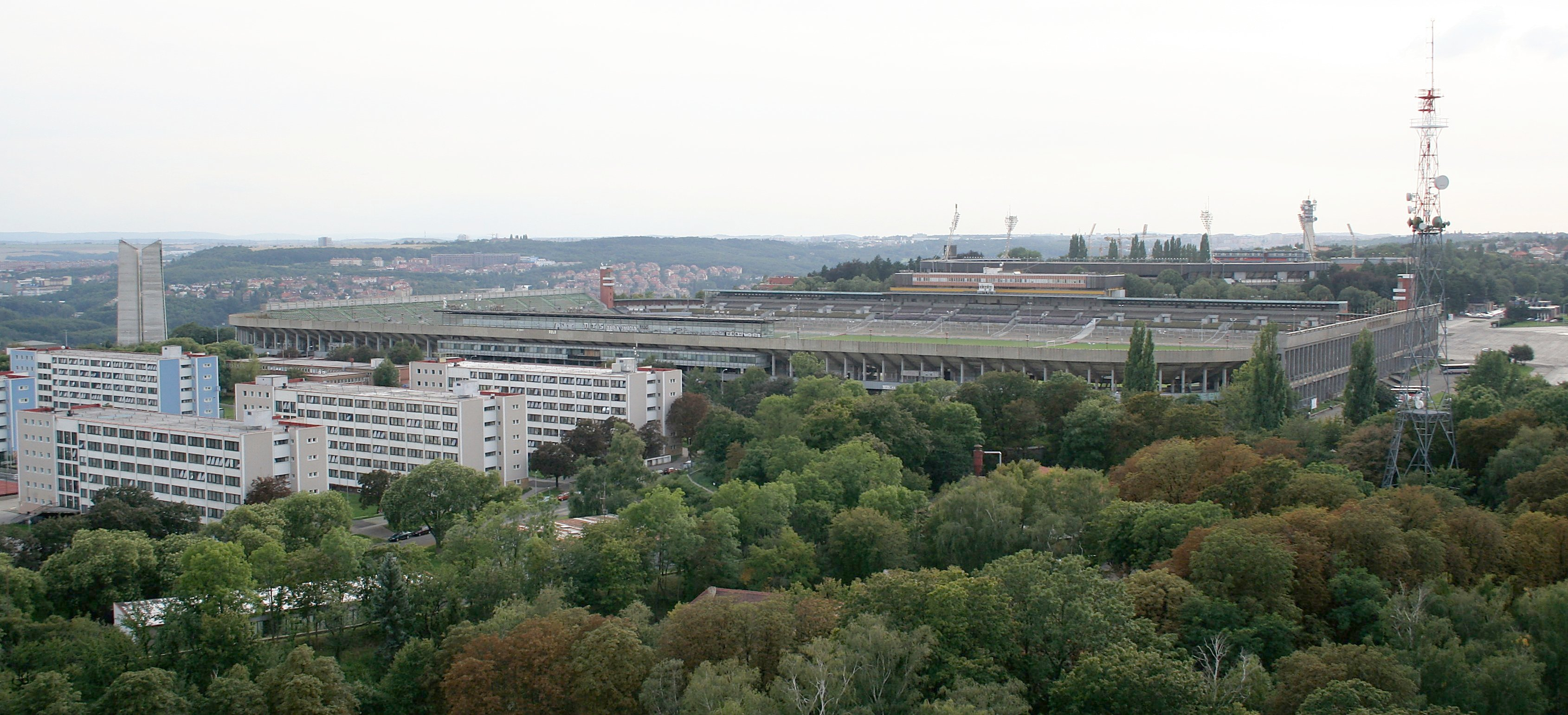
Great Strahov Stadium

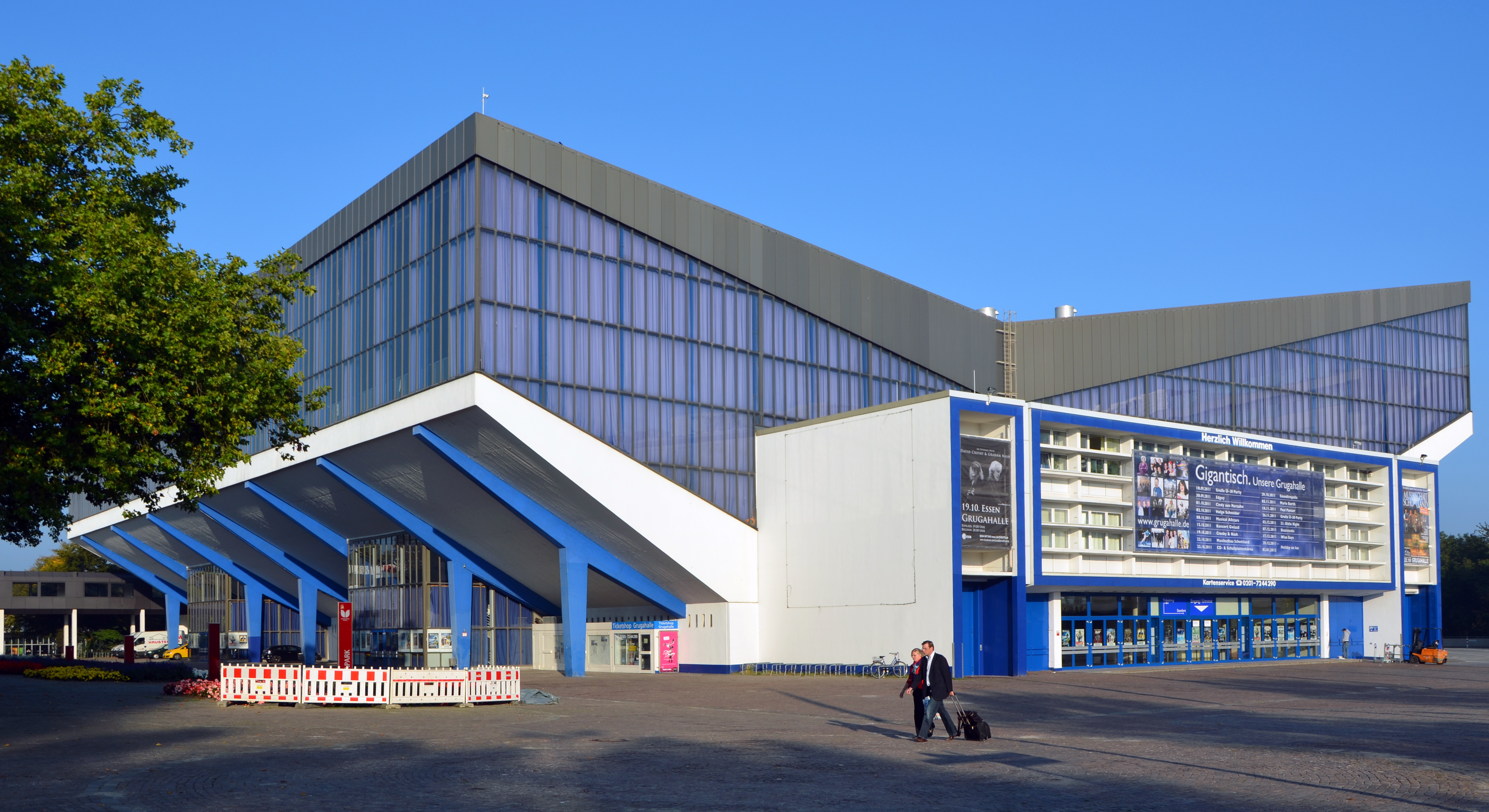
Grugahalle

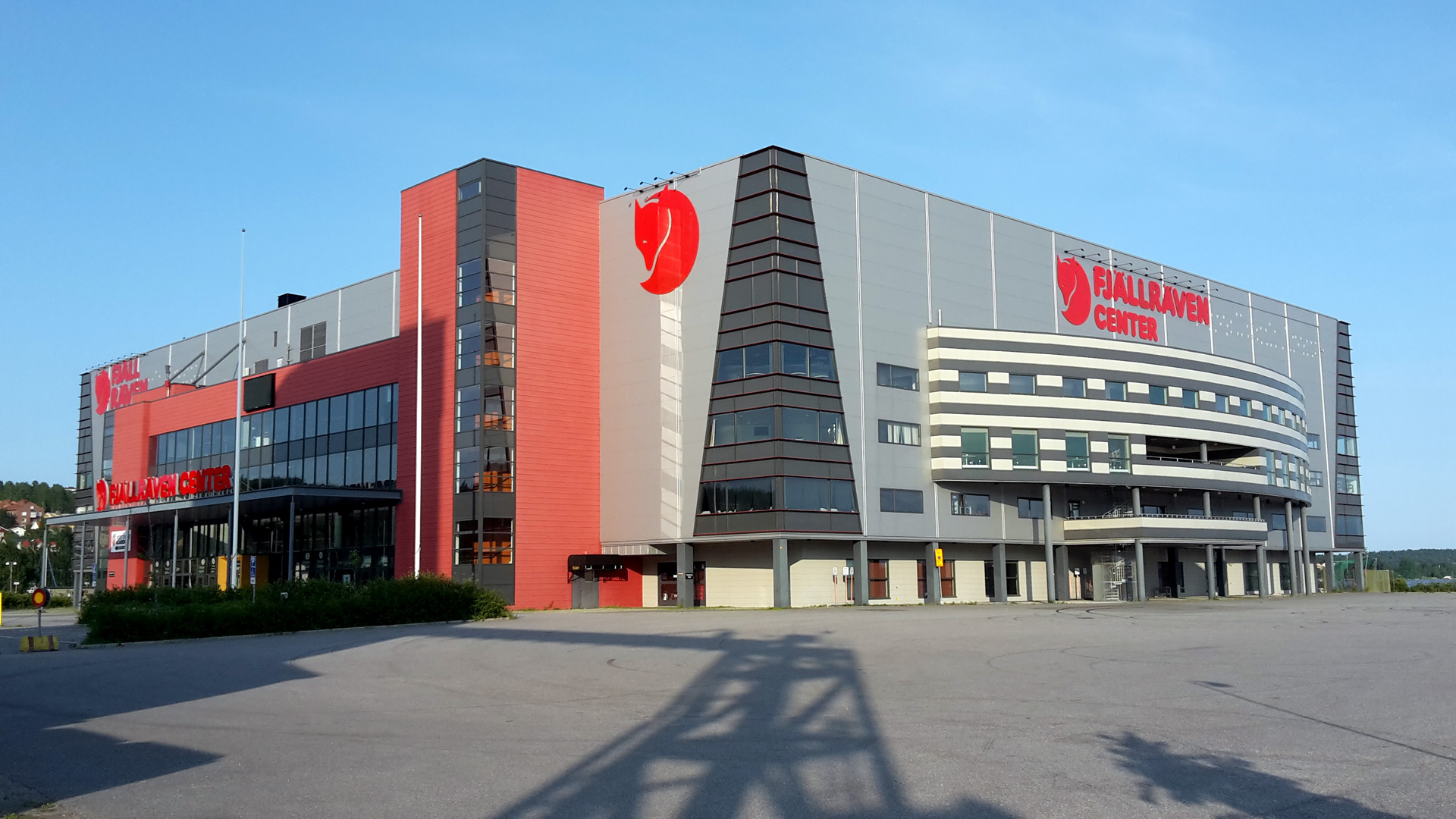
Hägglunds Arena

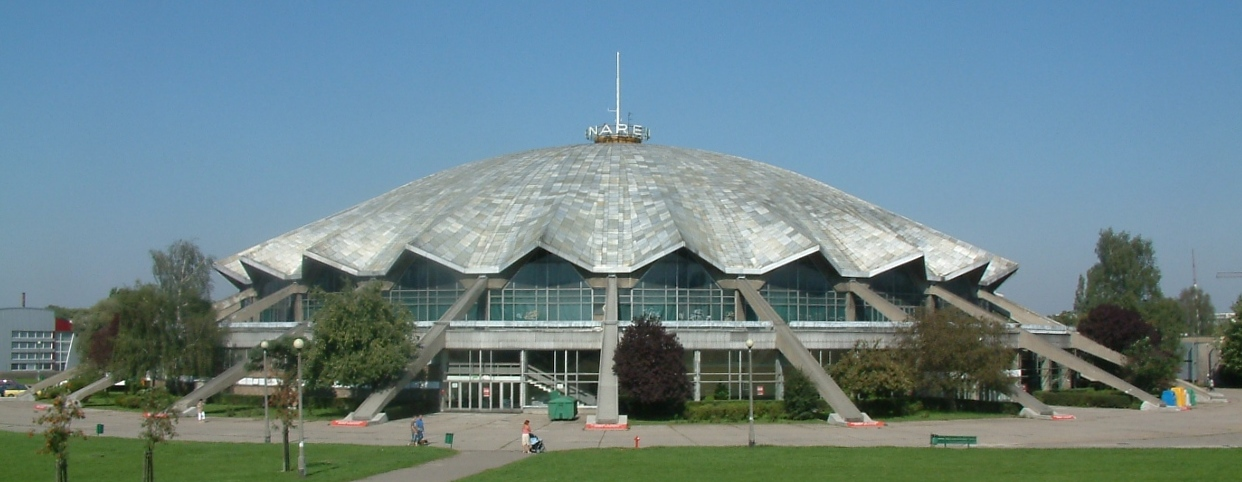
Hala Arena

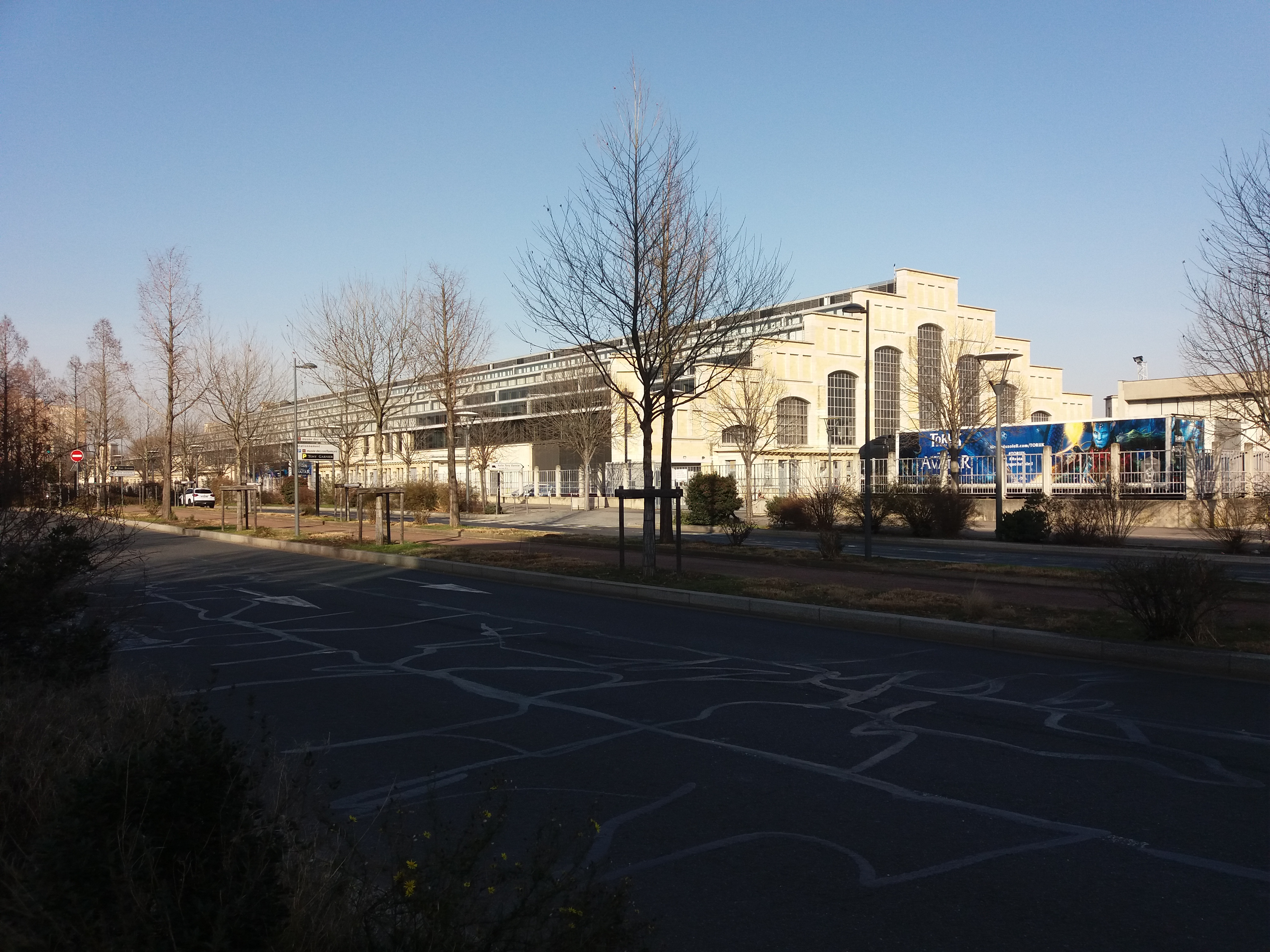
Halle Tony Garnier

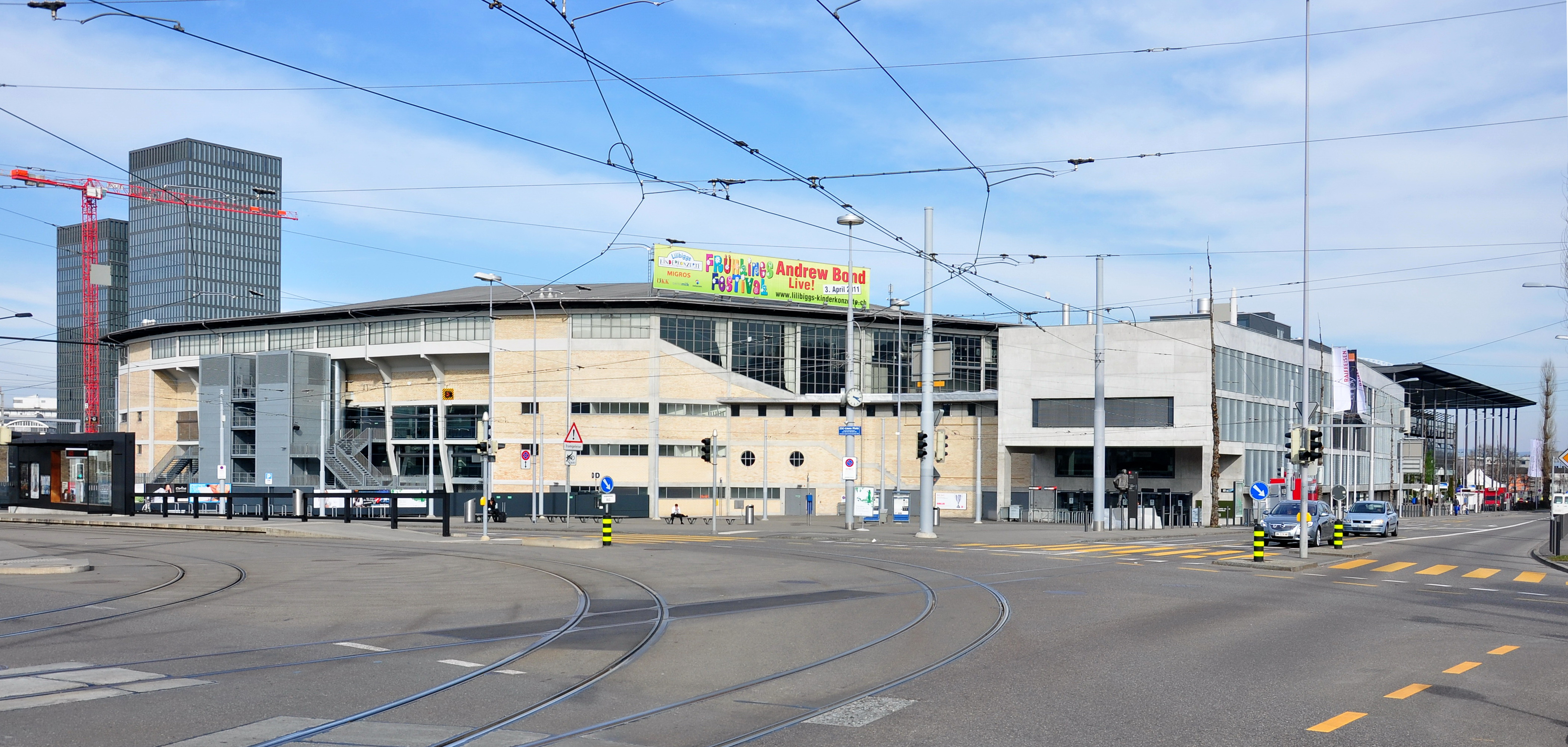
Hallenstadion

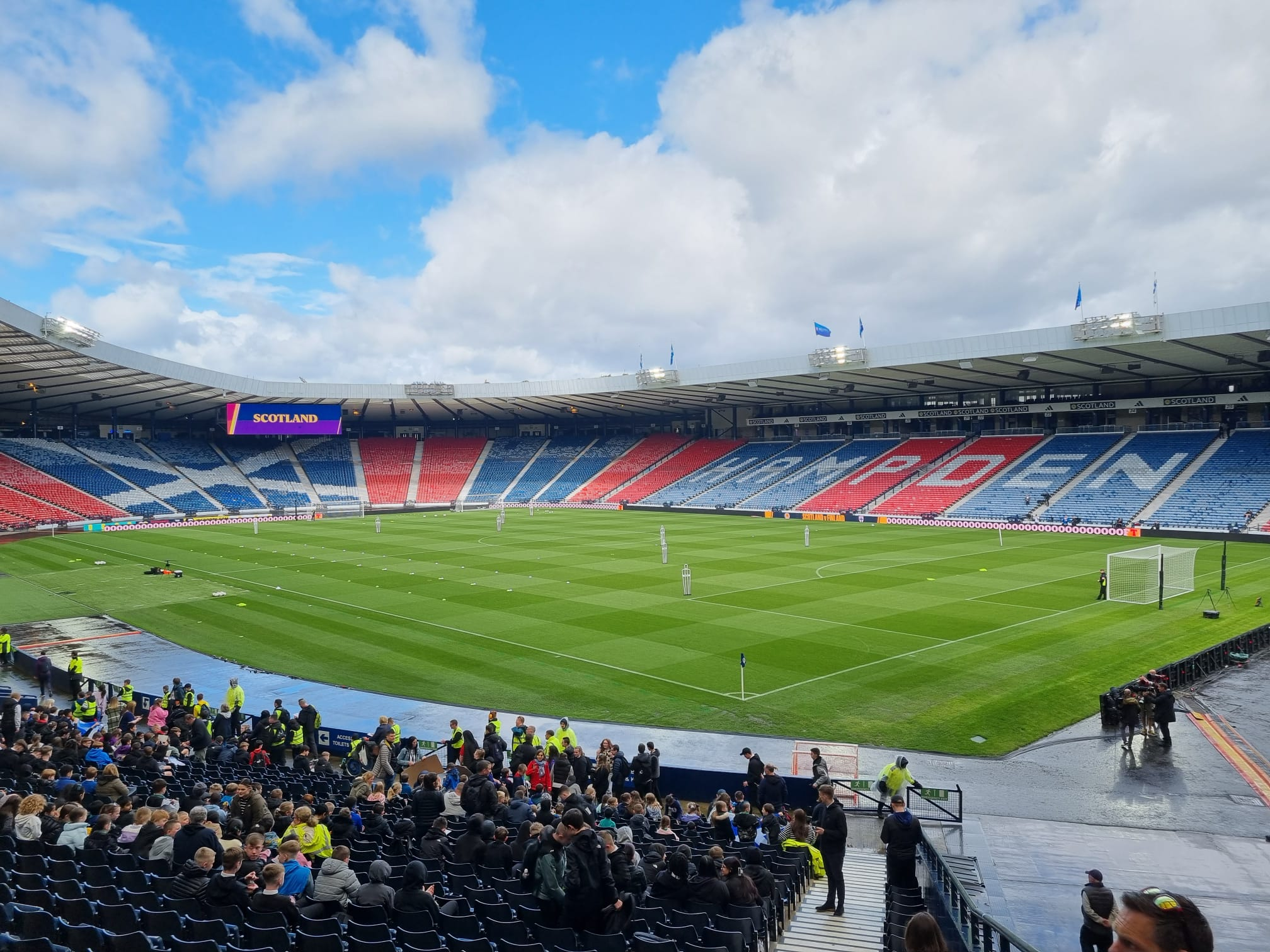
Hampden Park

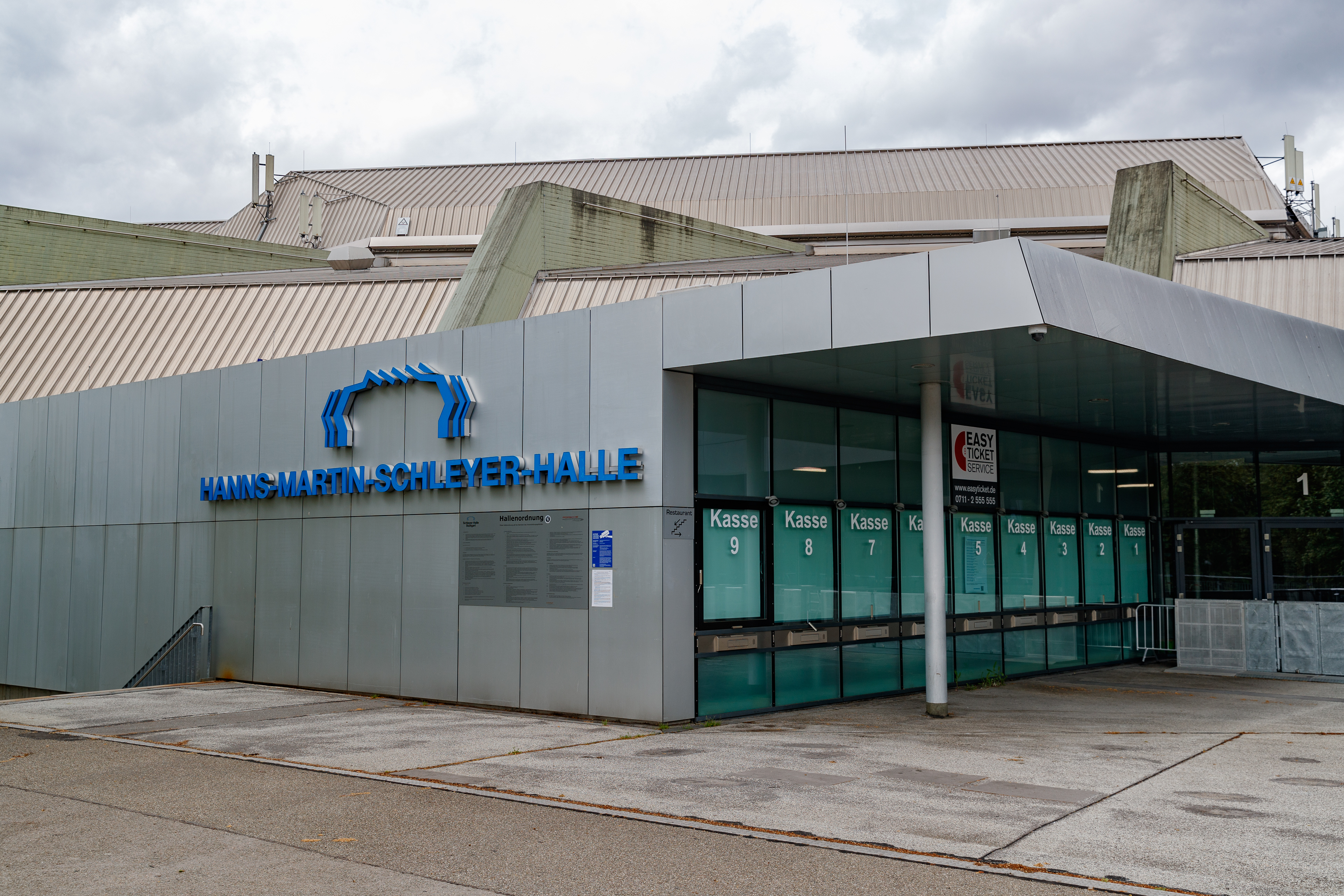
Hanns-Martin-Schleyer-Halle

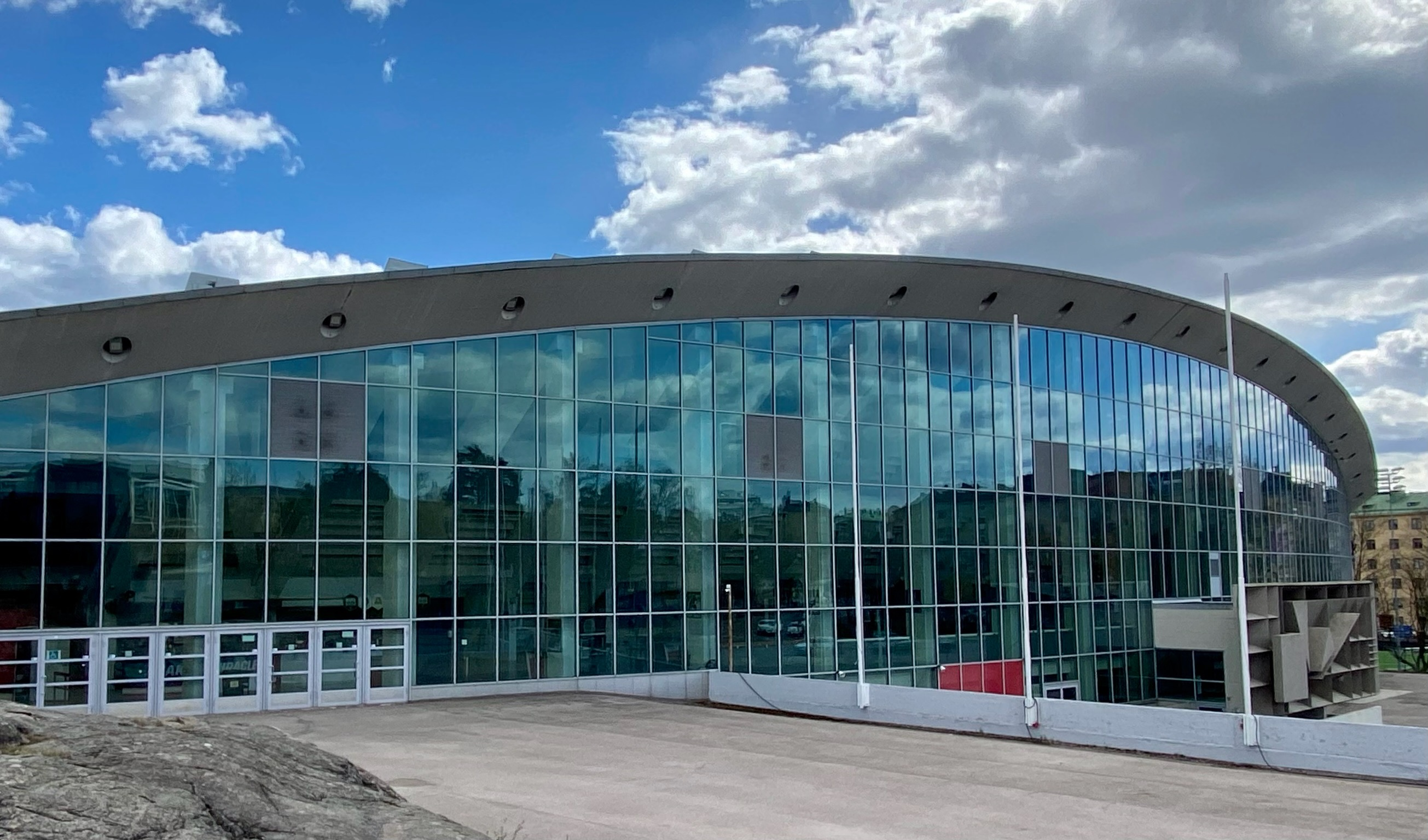
Helsinki Ice Hall

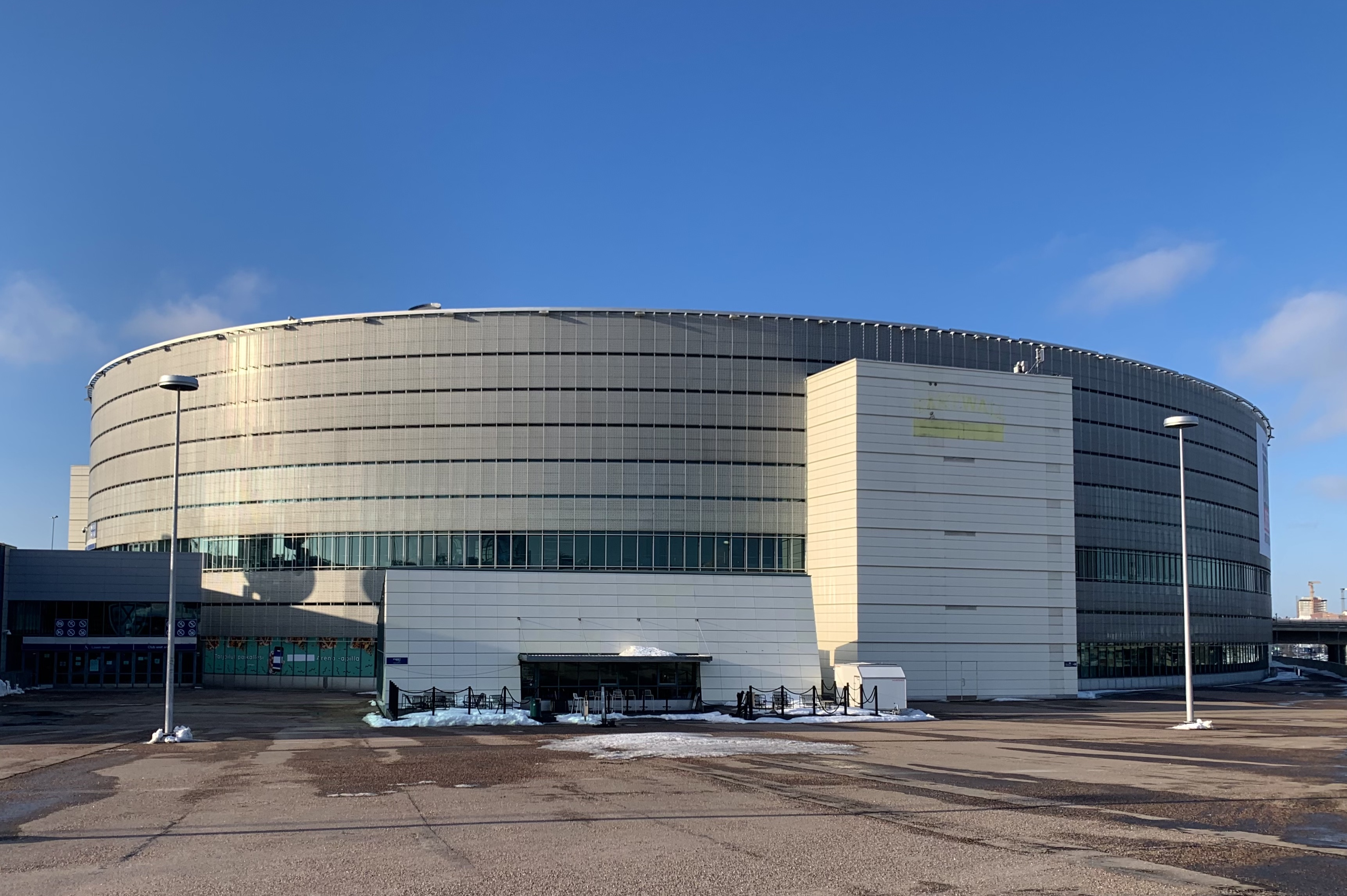
Helsinki Halli

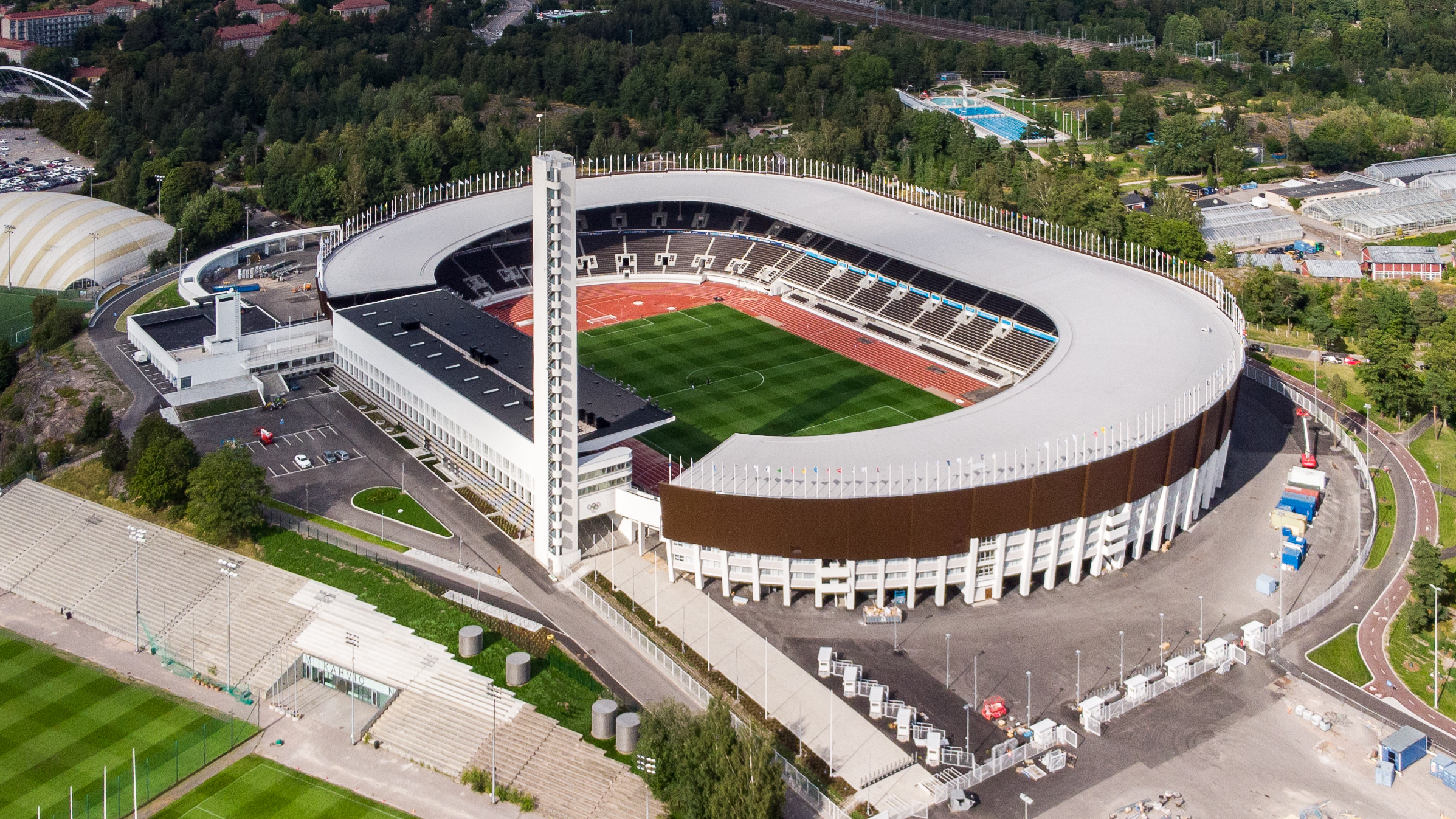
Helsinki Olympic Stadium

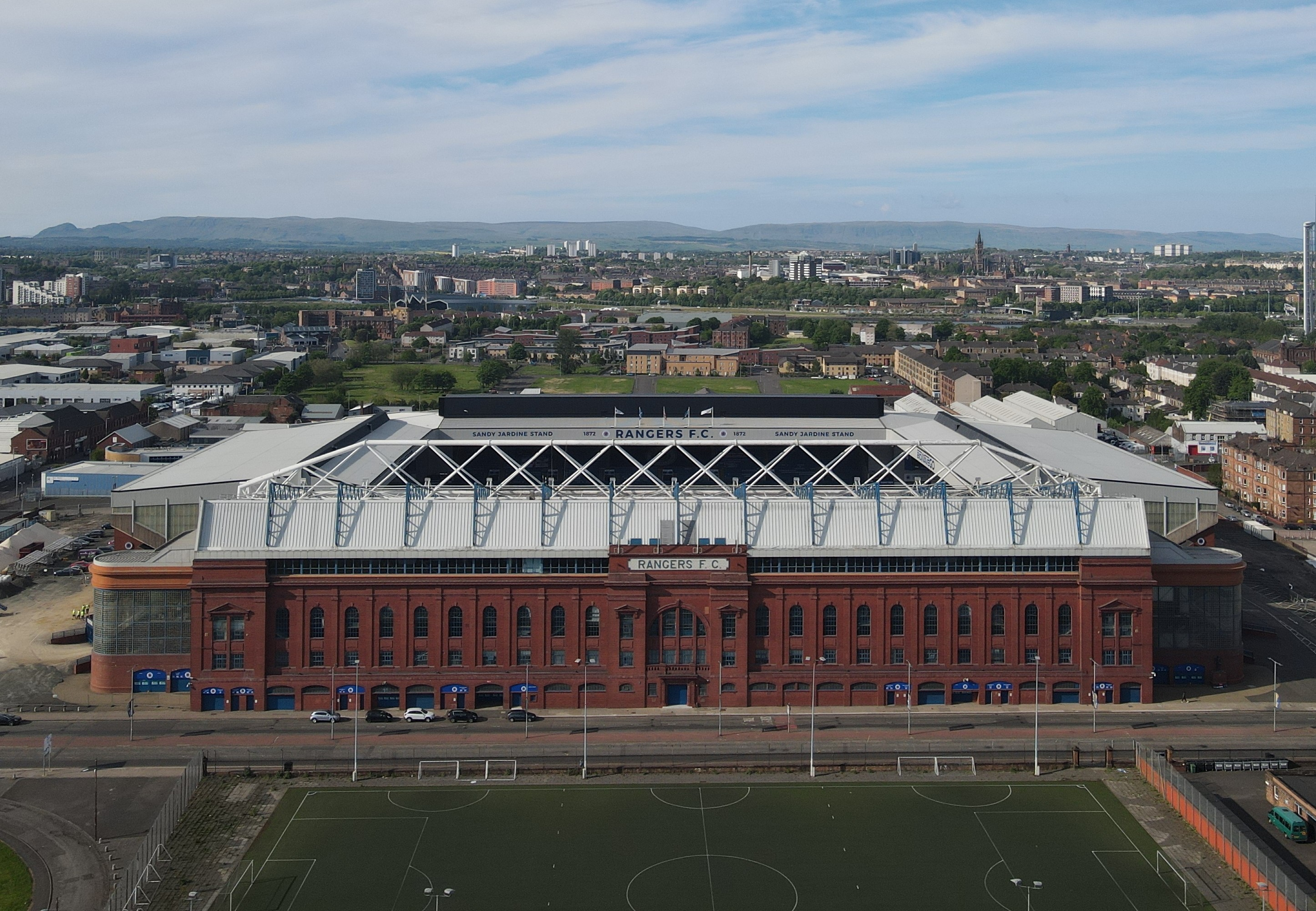
Ibrox Stadium

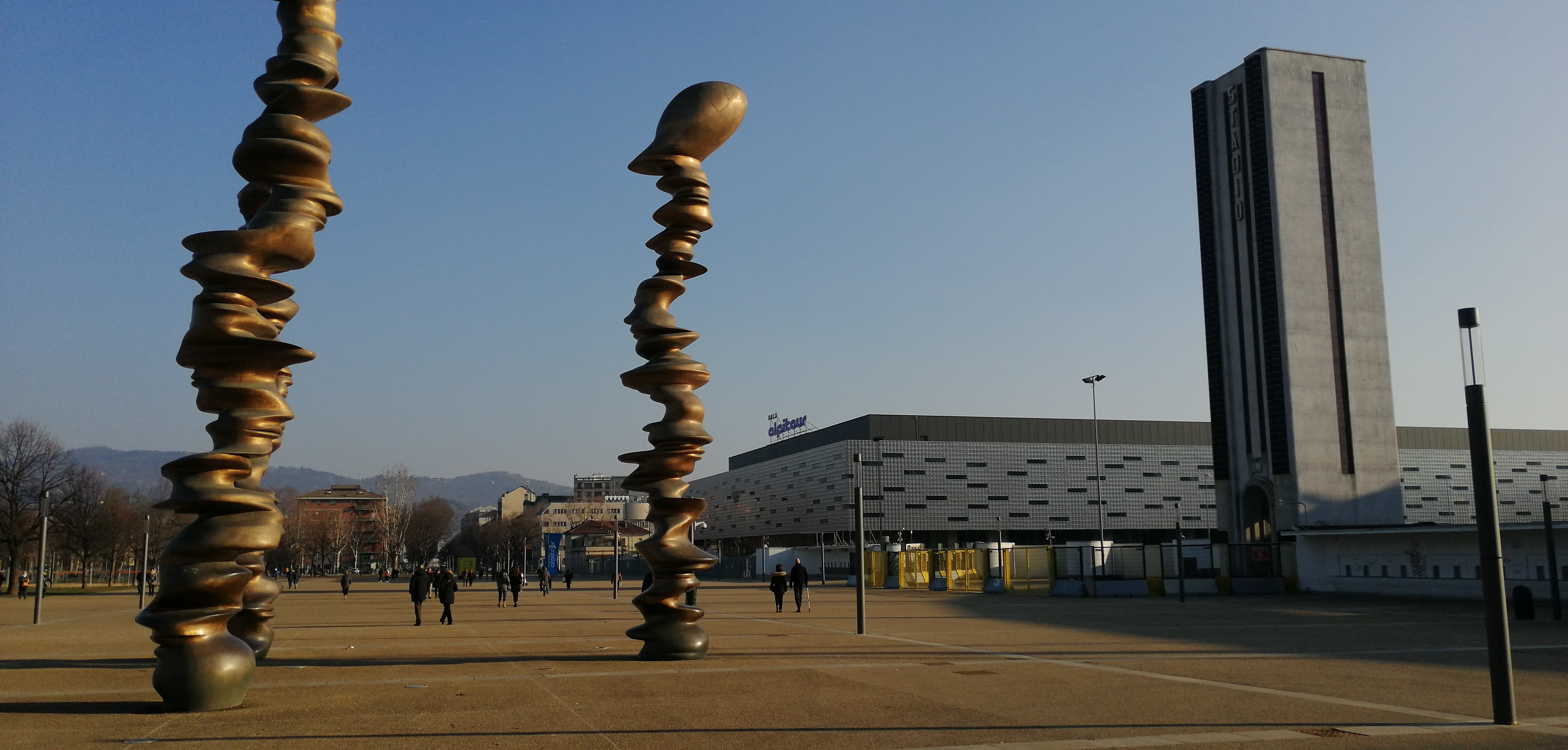
Inalpi Arena

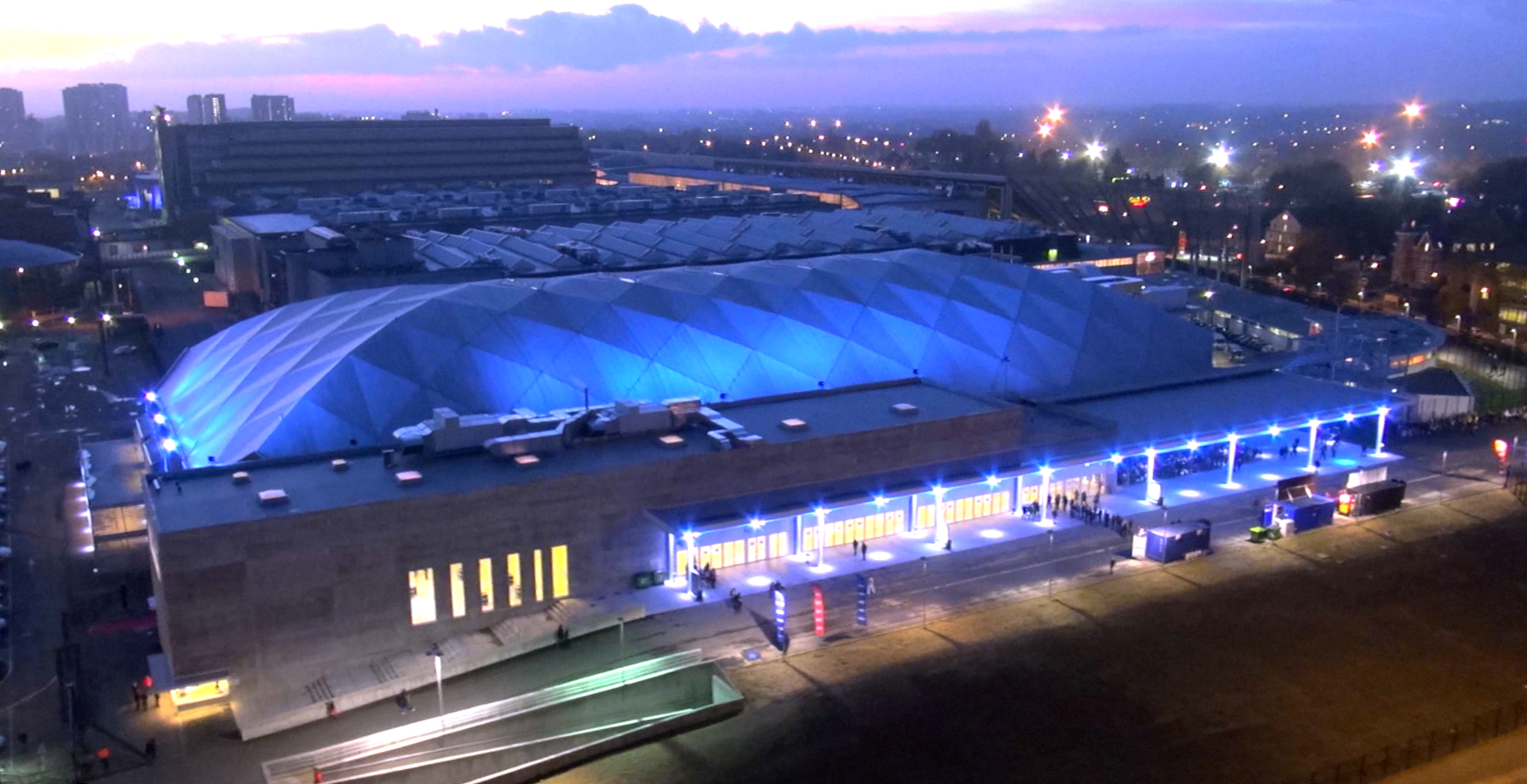
ING Arena

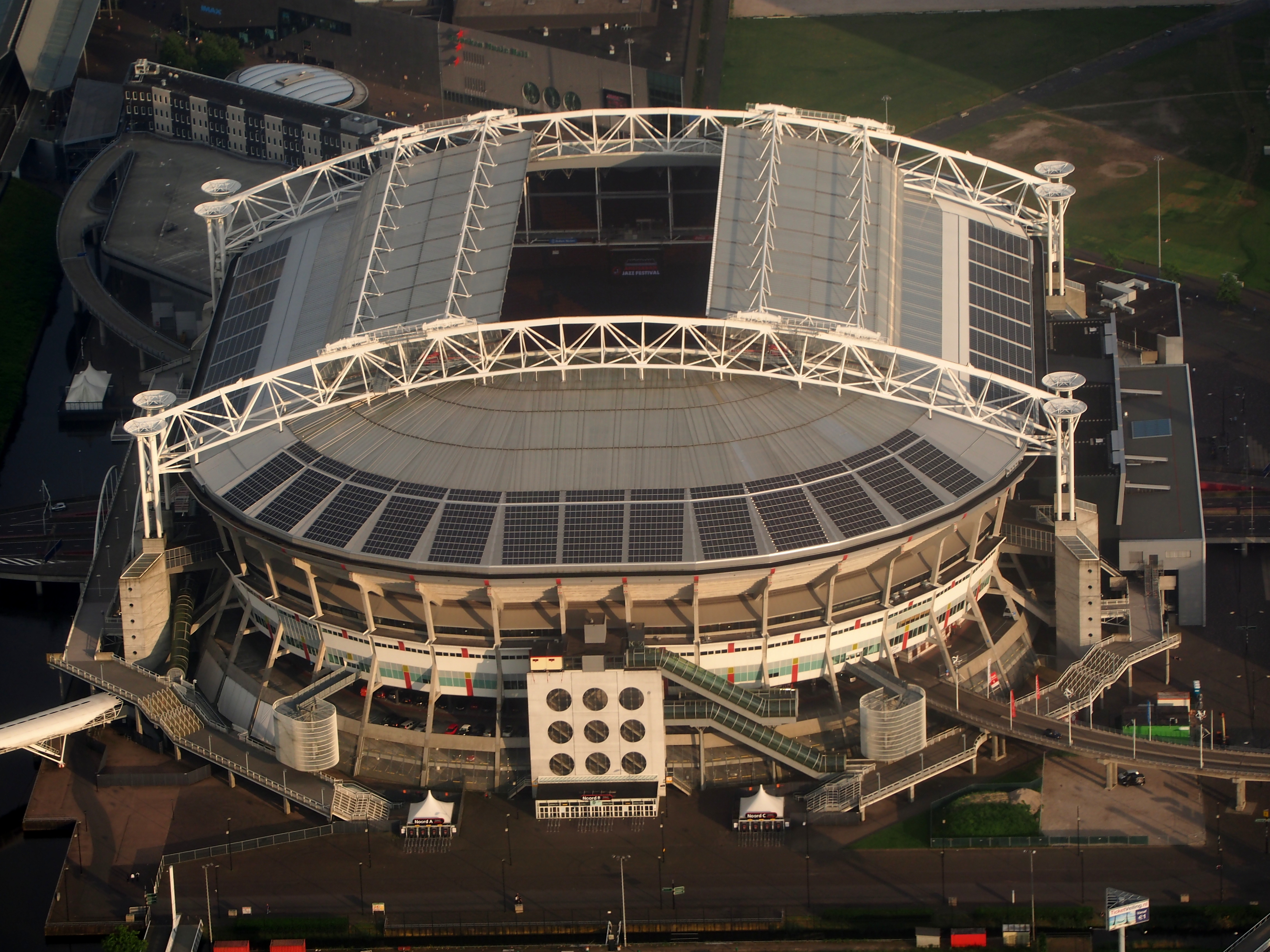
Johan Cruyff Arena

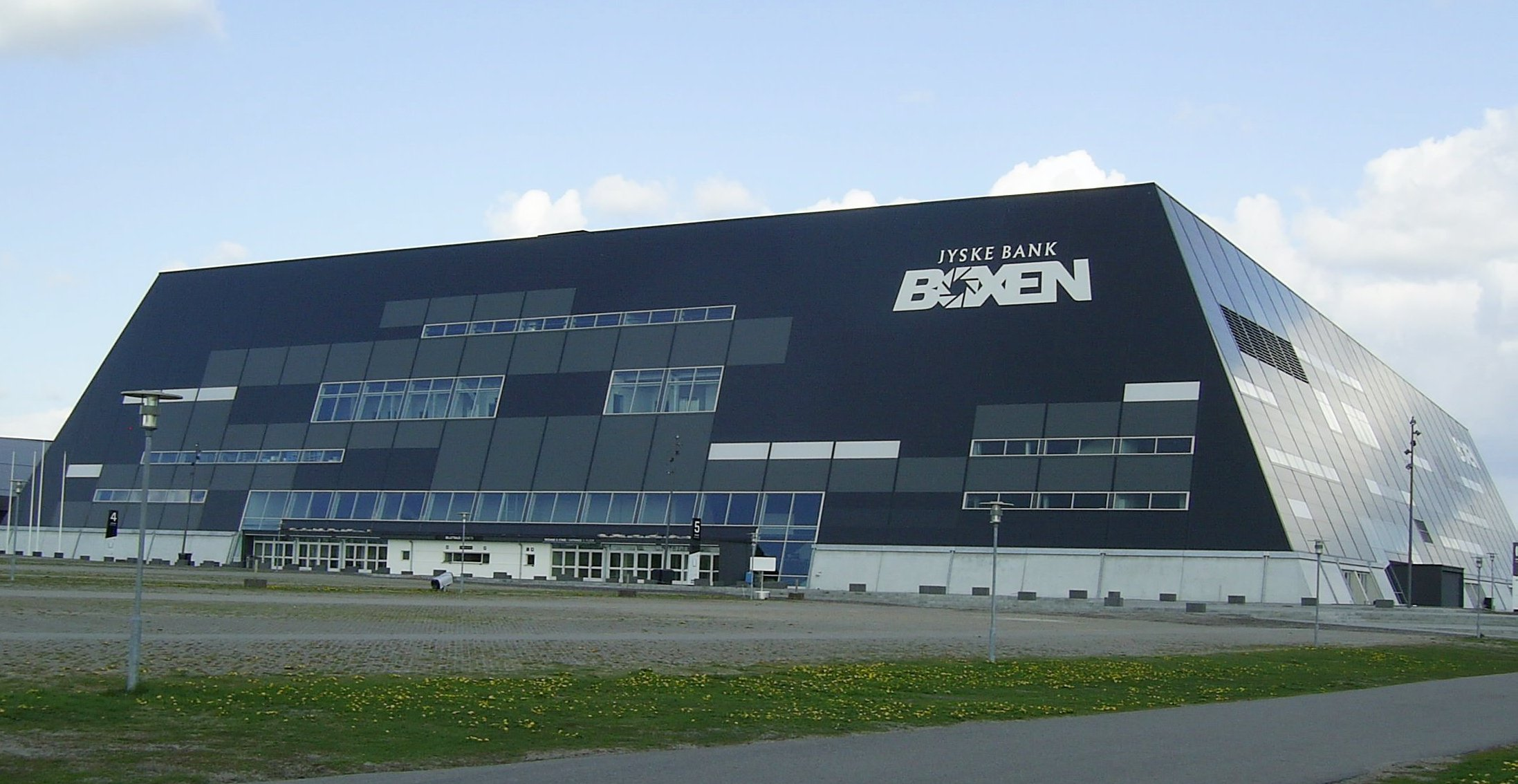
Jyske Bank Boxen

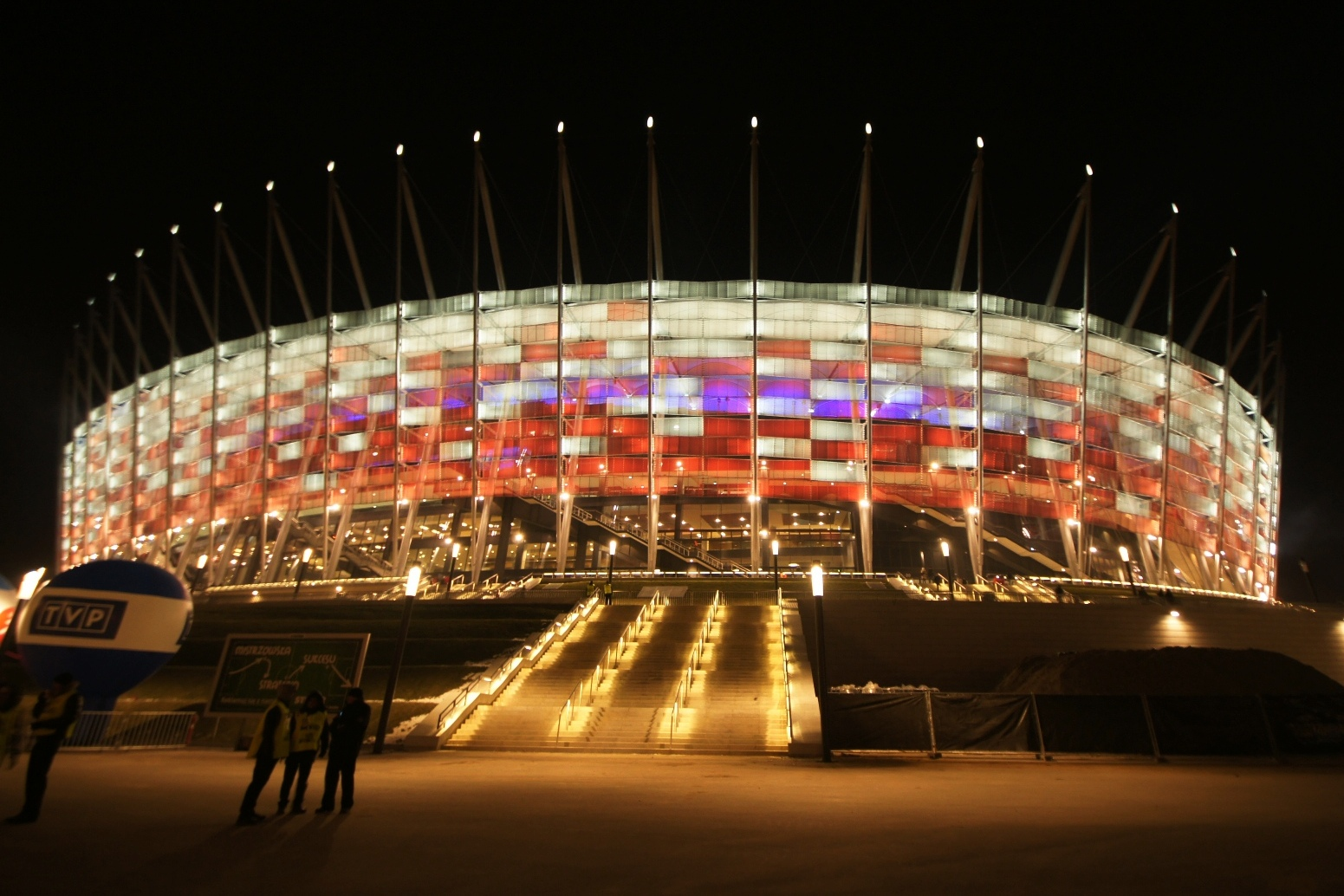
Kazimierz Górski National Stadium

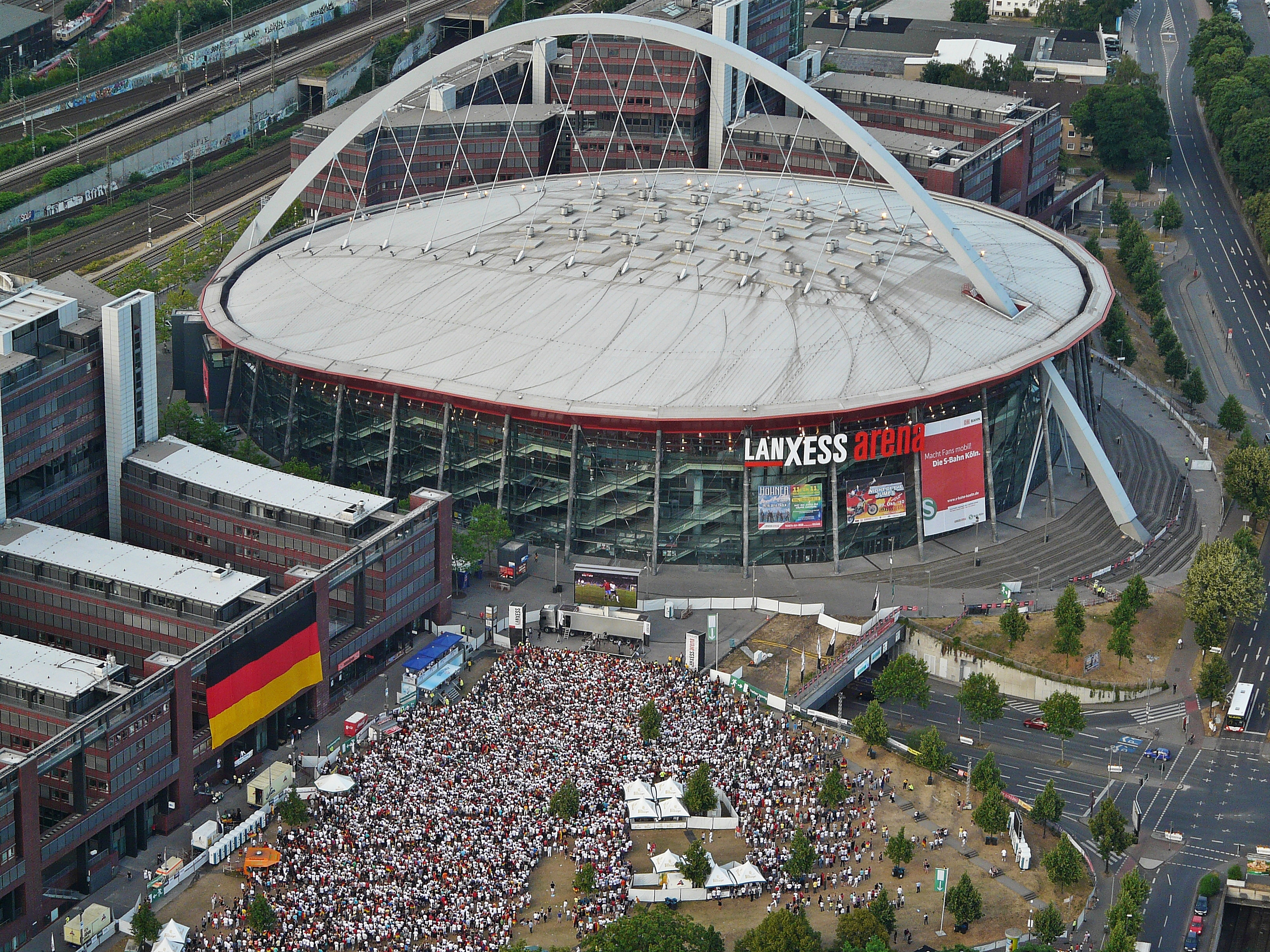
Lanxess Arena

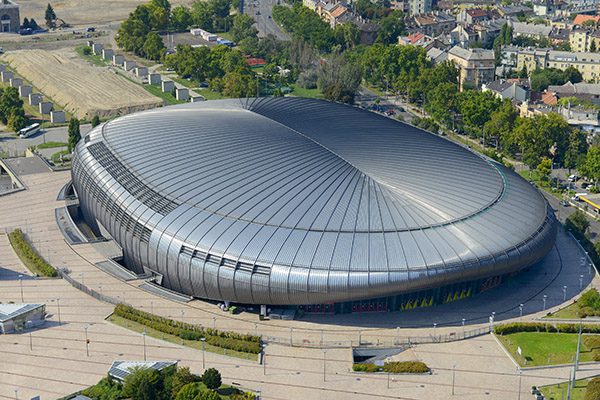
László Papp Budapest Sports Arena

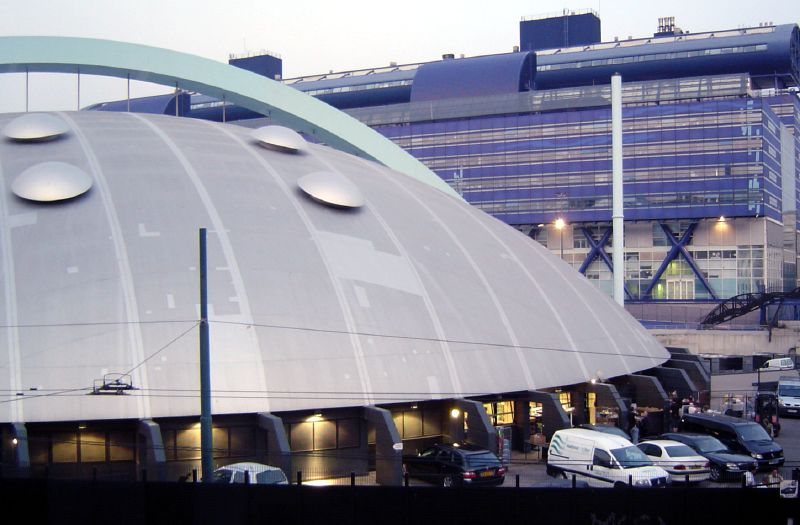
Le Dôme de Marseille

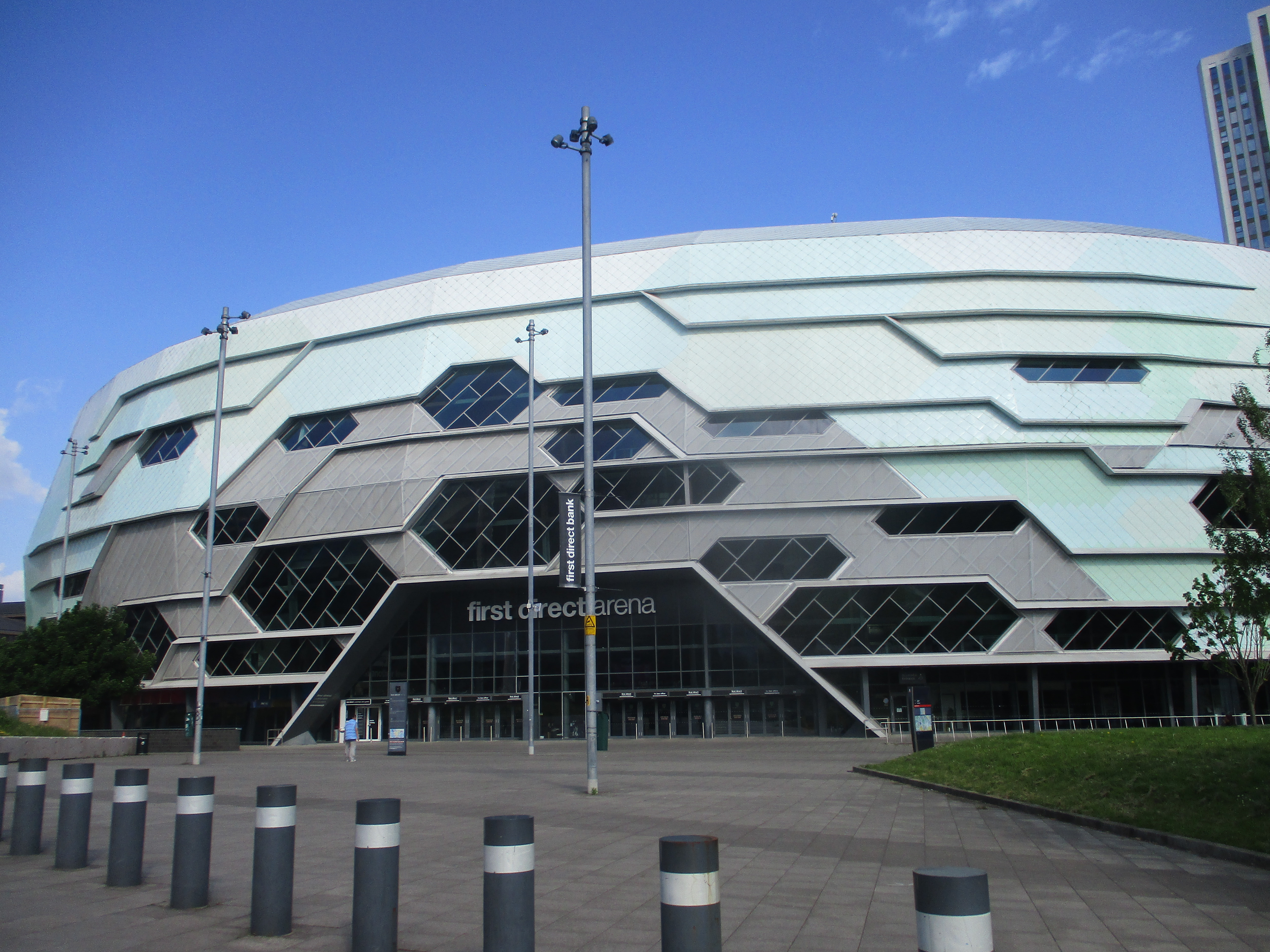
Leeds Arena

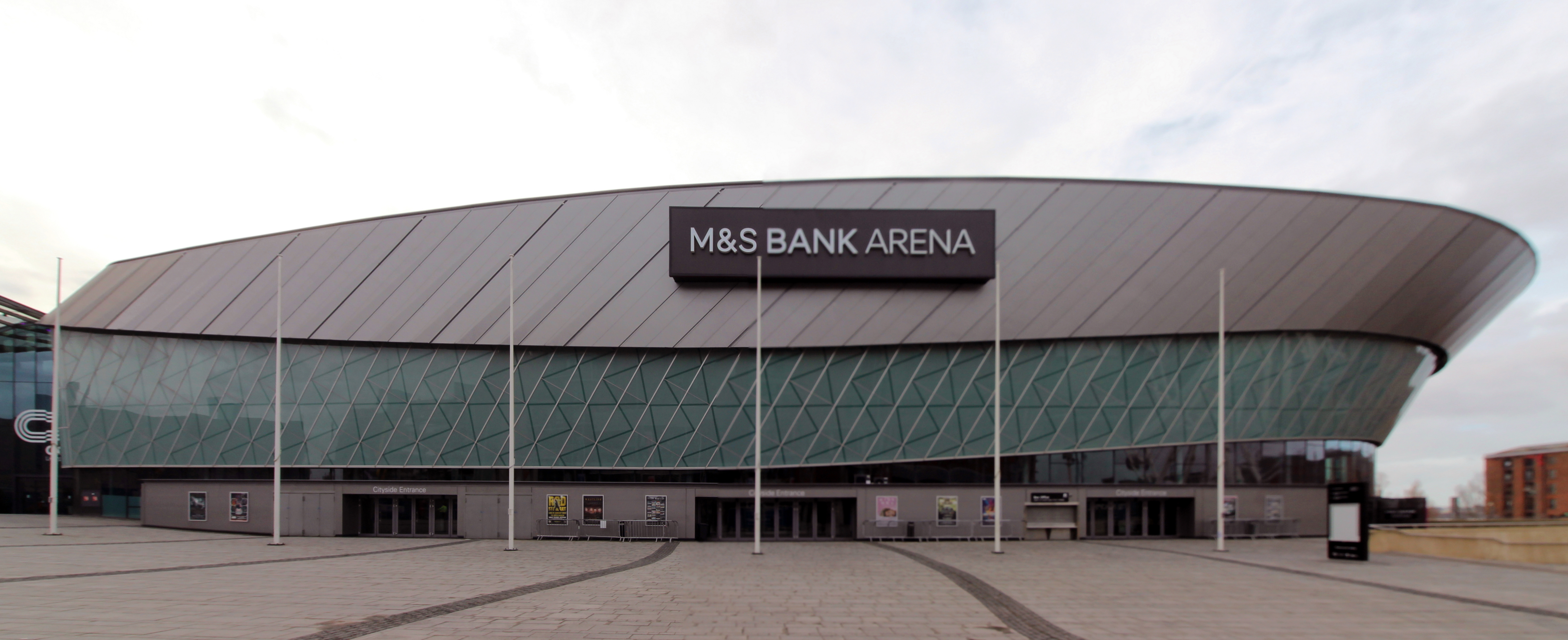
Liverpool Arena

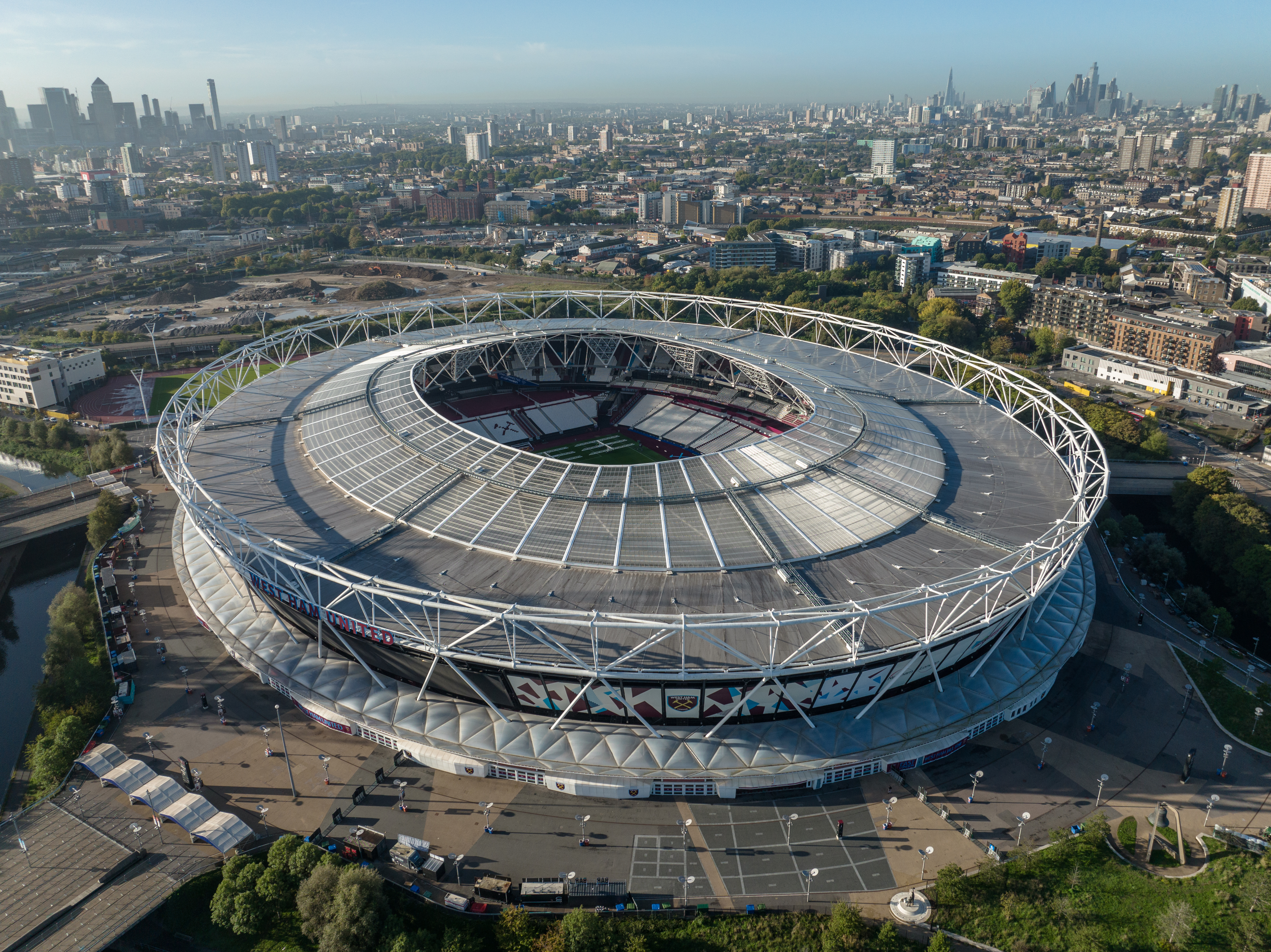
London Stadium

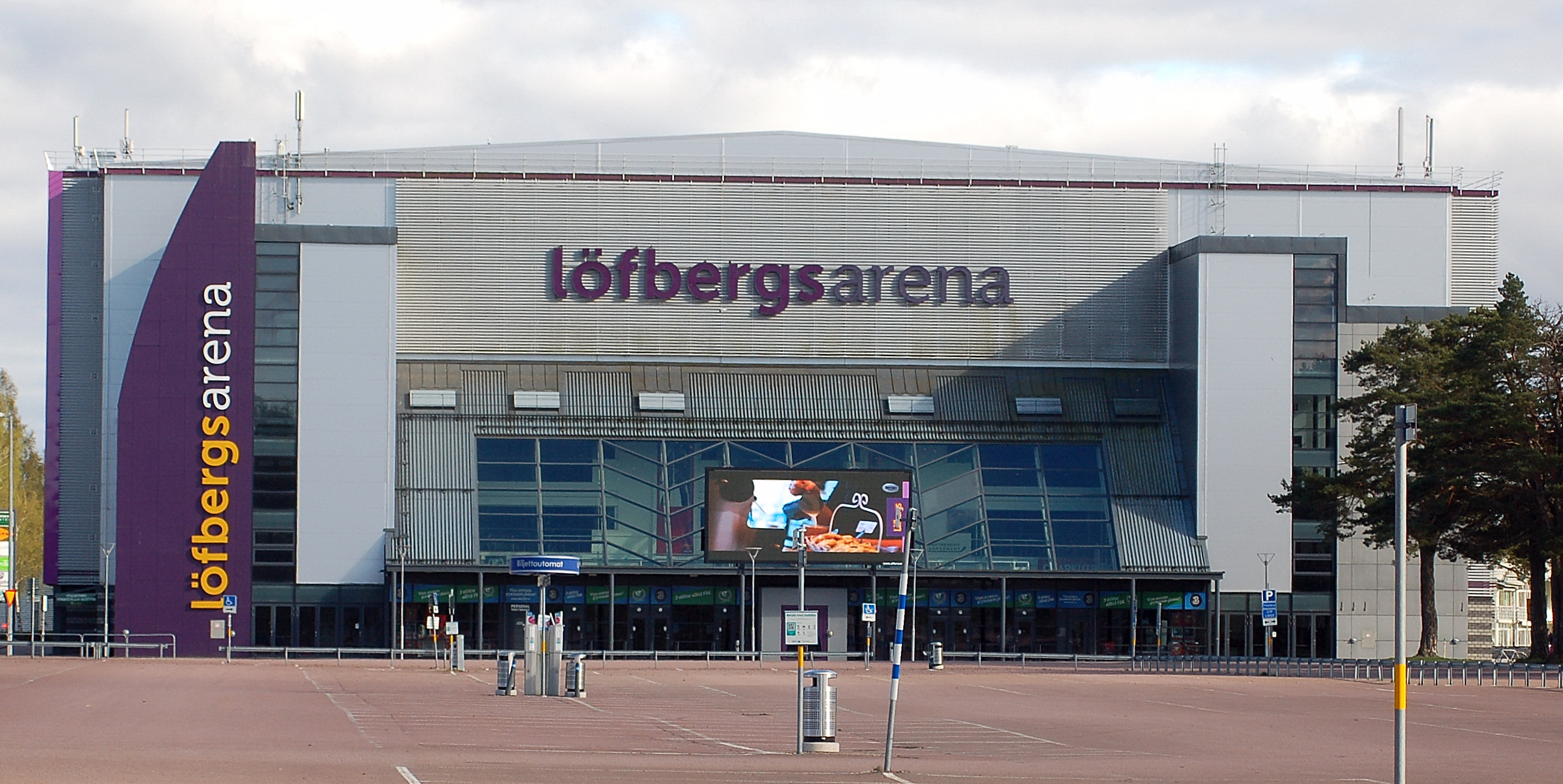
Löfbergs Arena

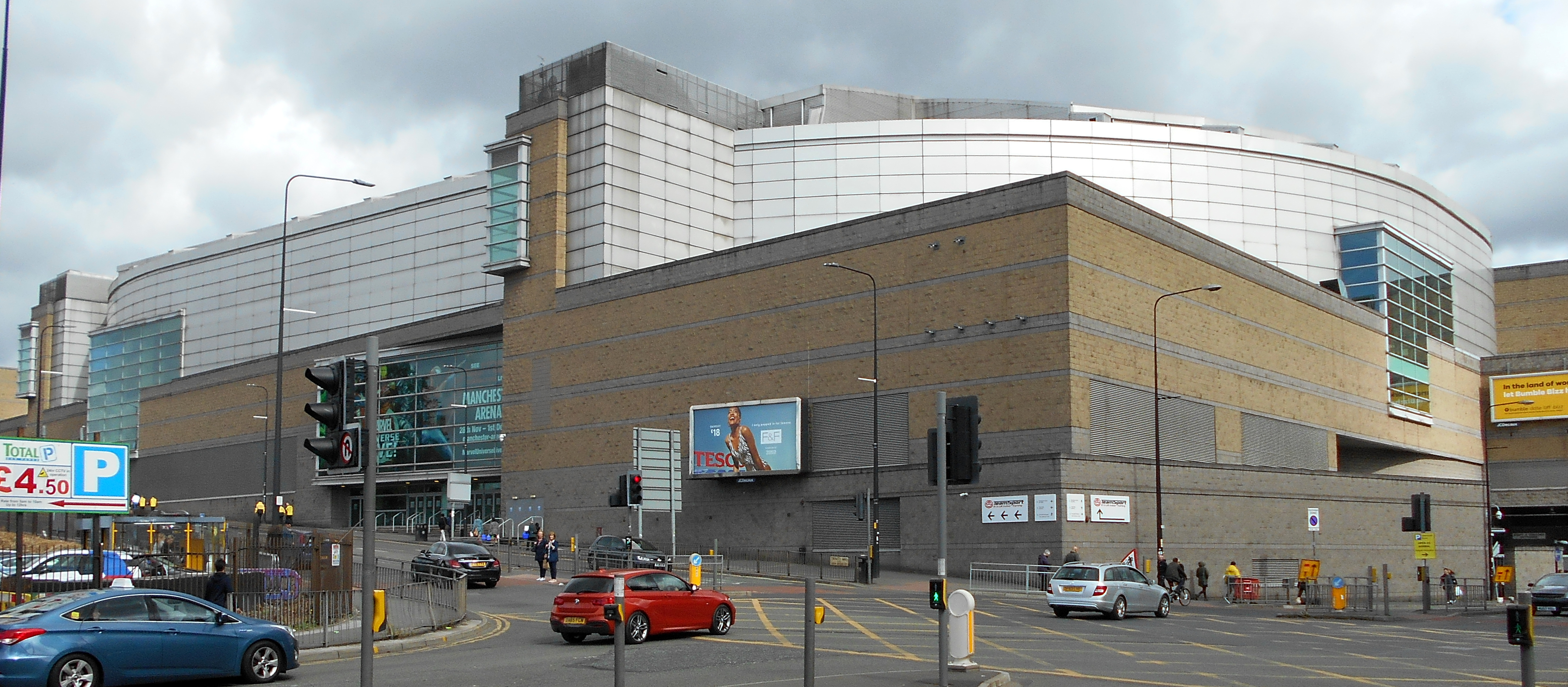
Manchester Arena

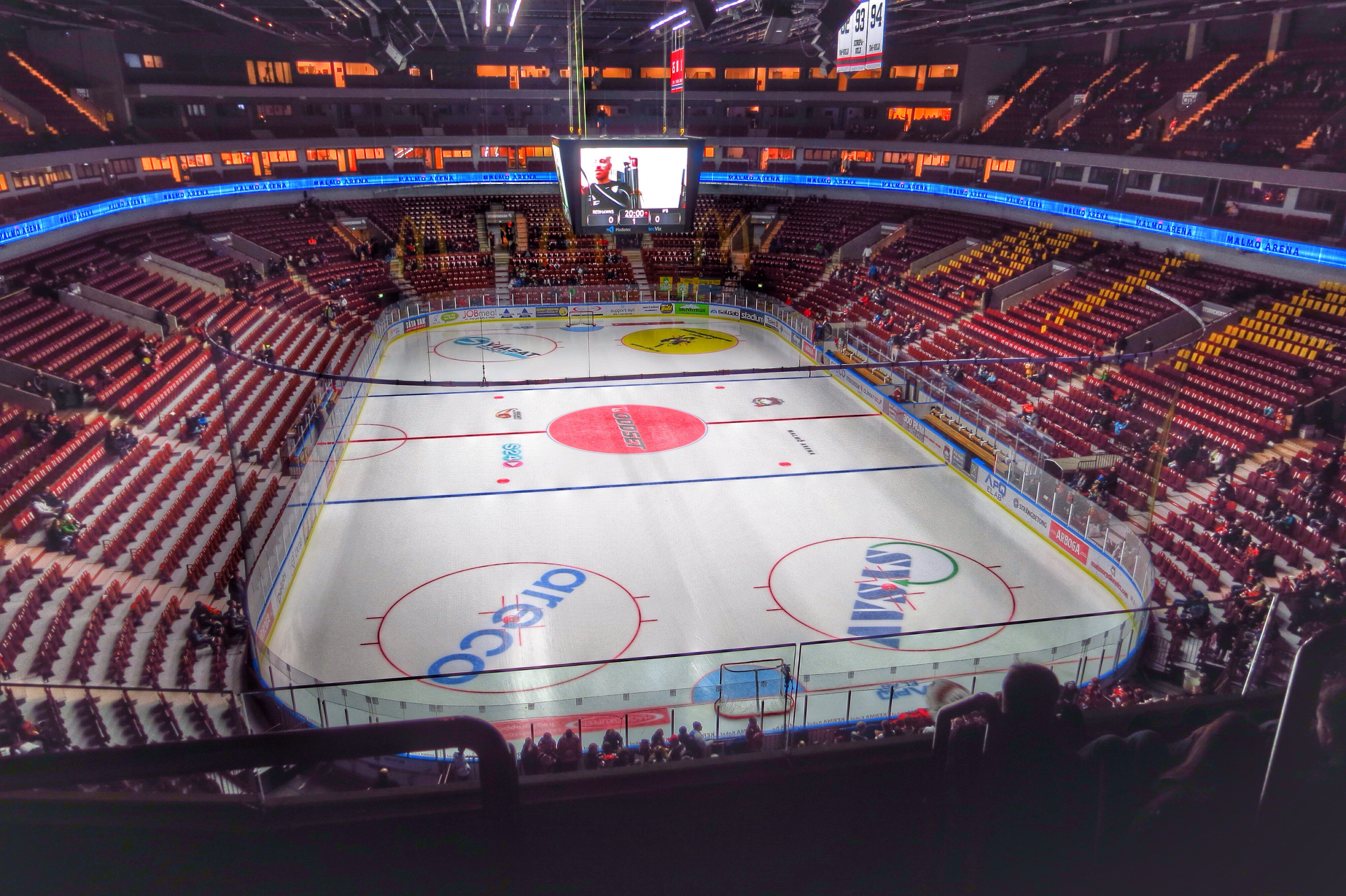
Malmö Arena

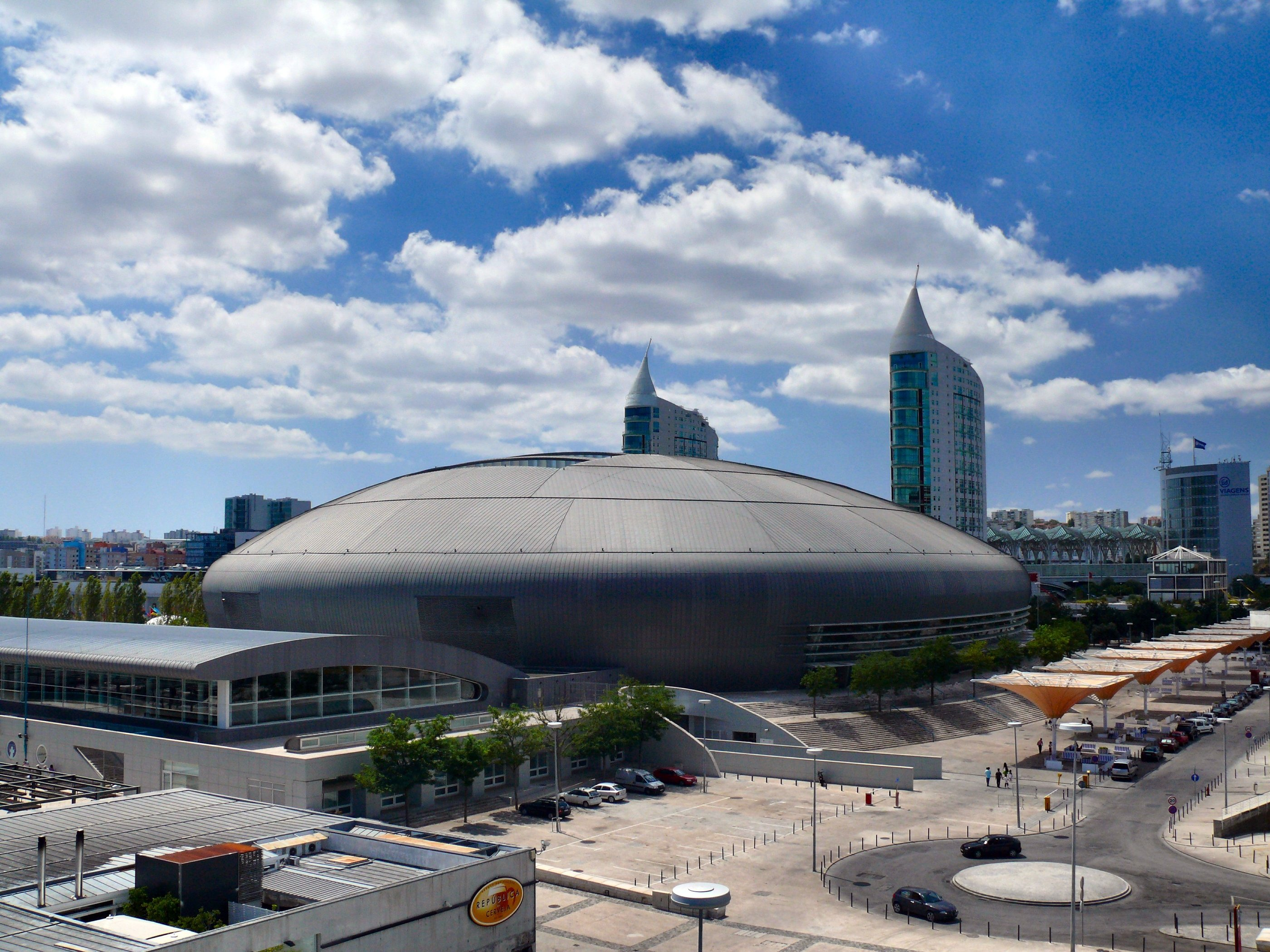
MEO Arena

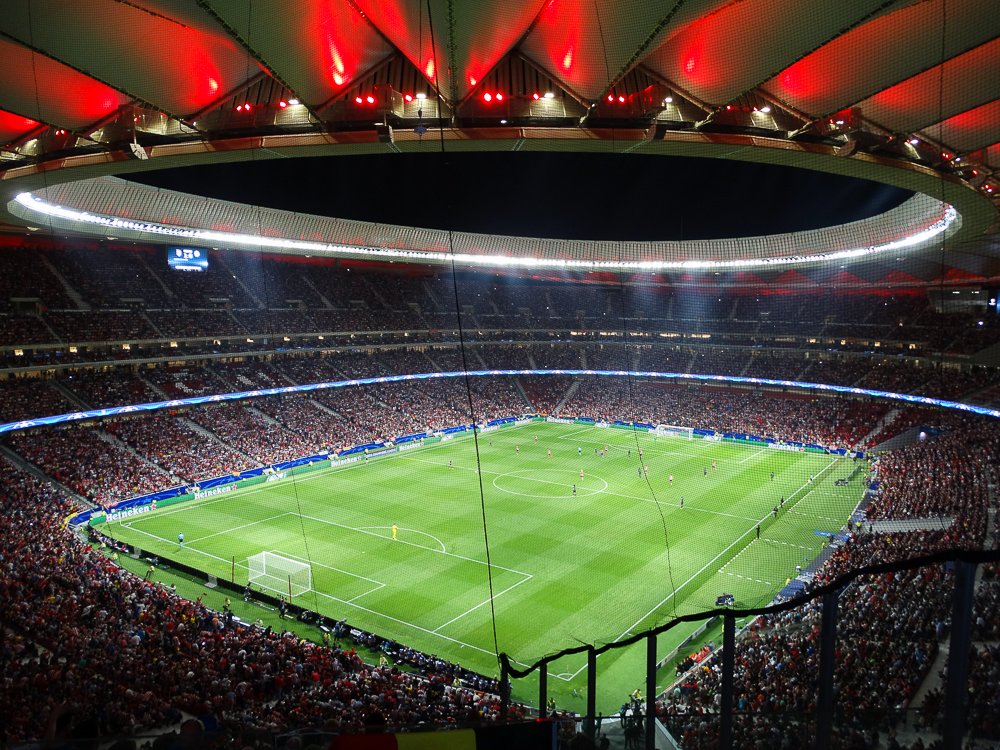
Metropolitano Stadium

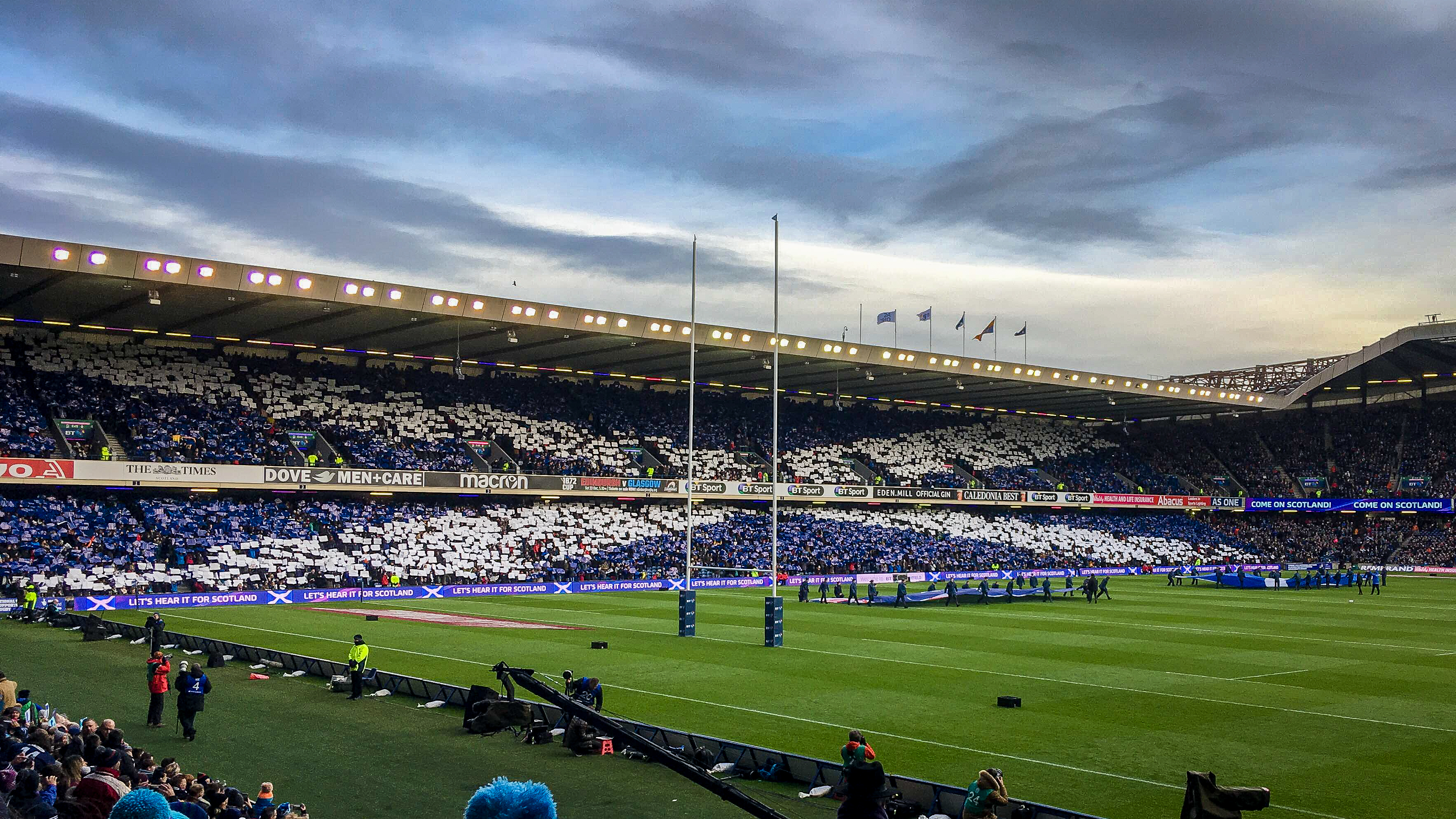
Murrayfield Stadium

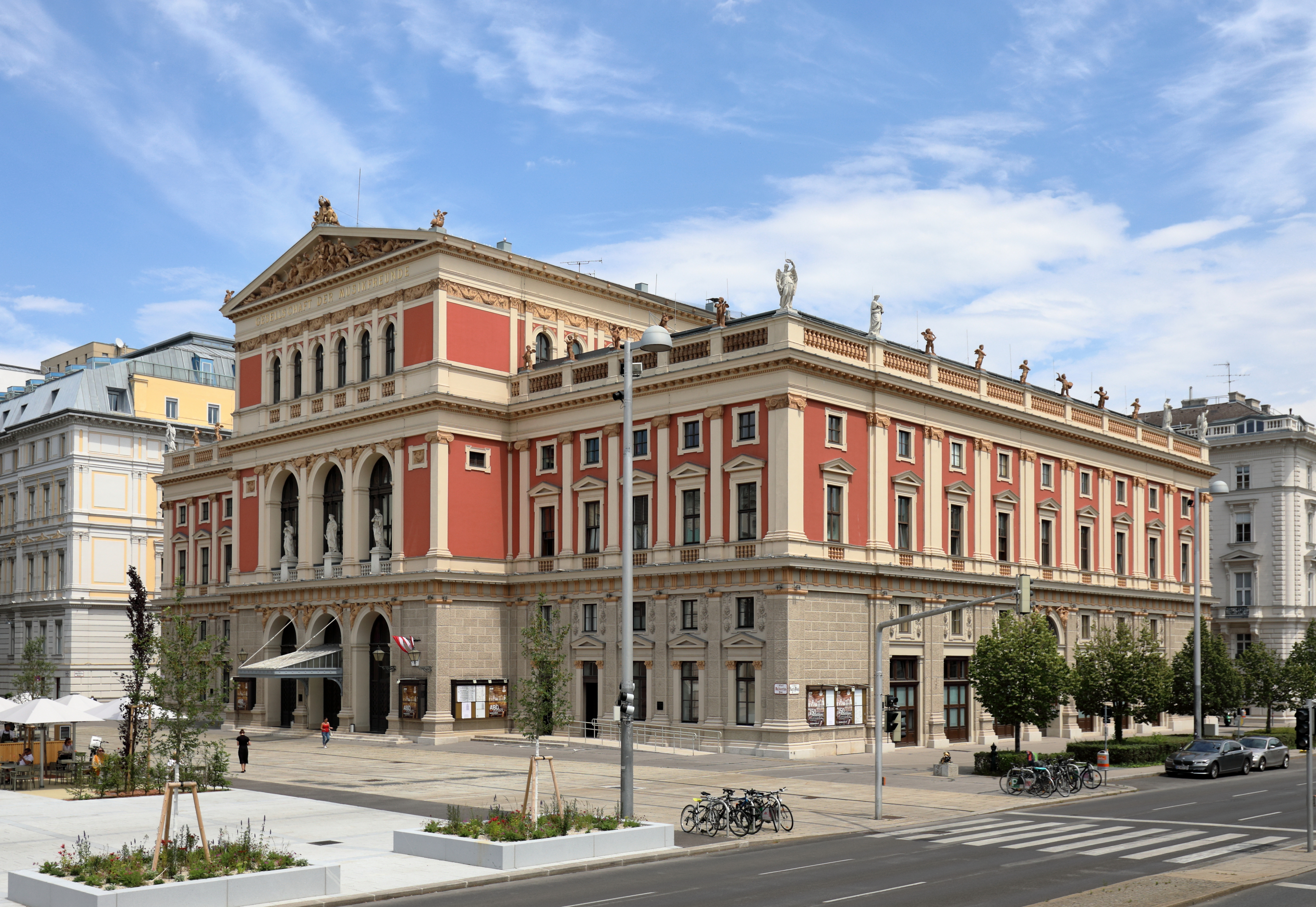
Musikverein

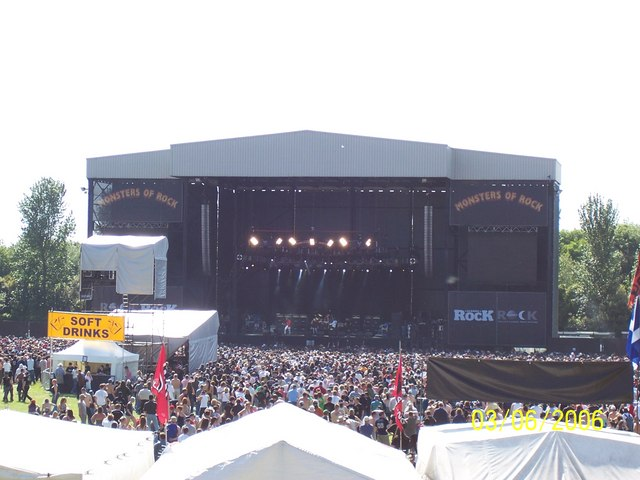
National Bowl

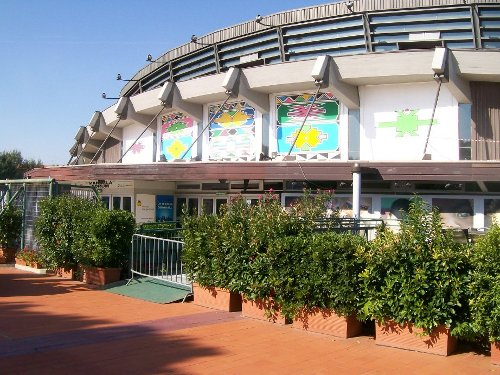
Nelson Mandela Forum

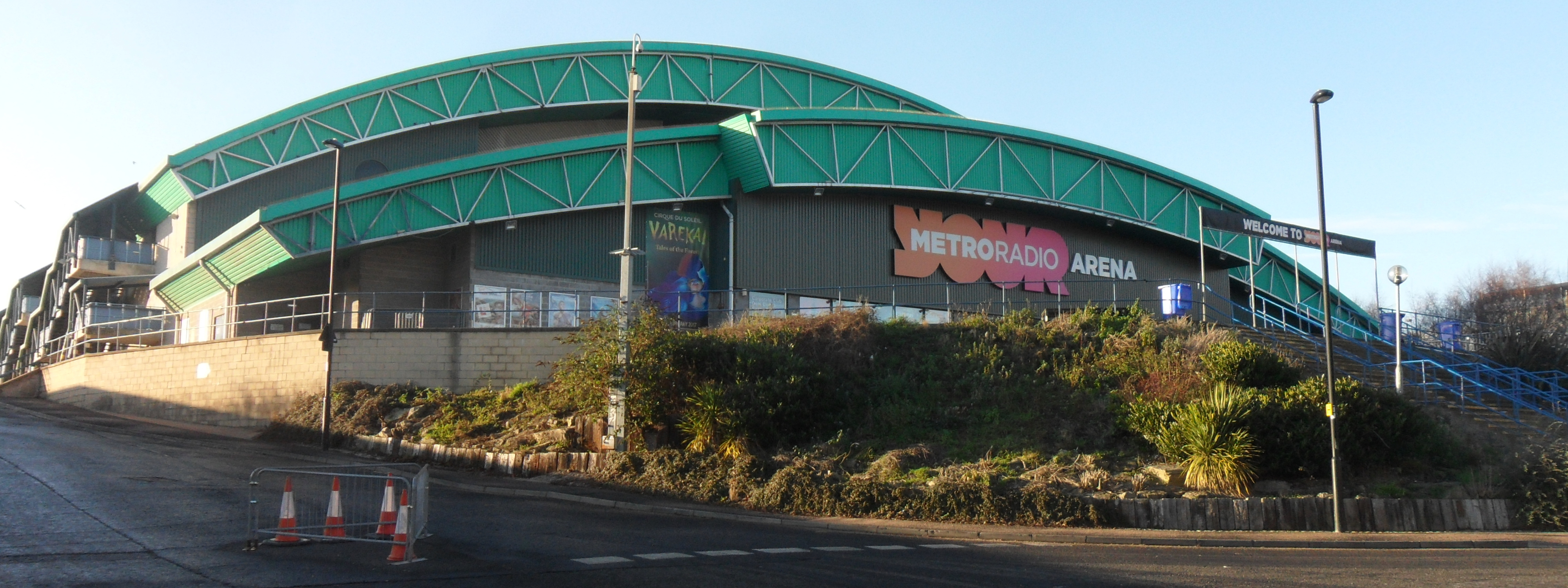
Newcastle Arena

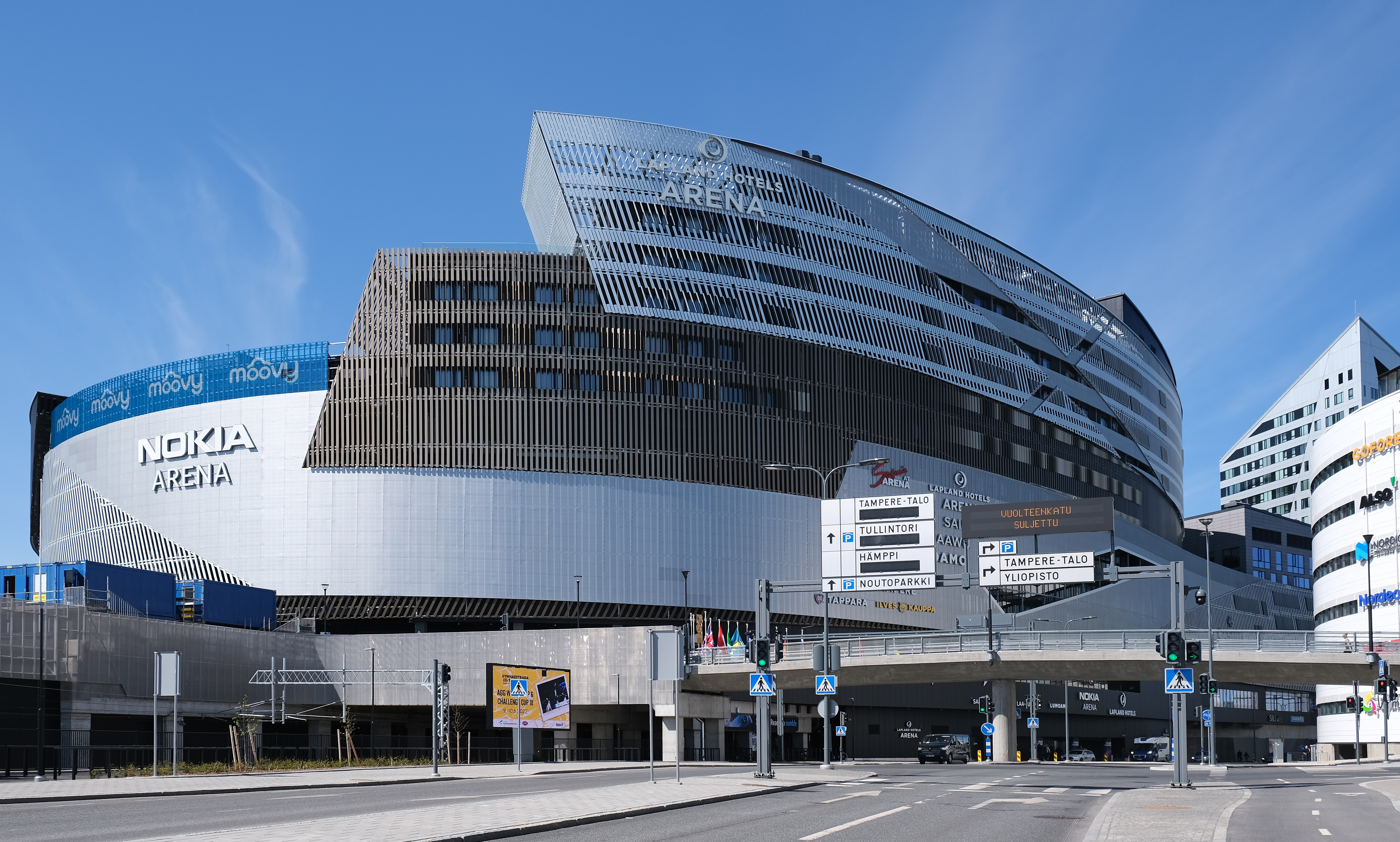
Nokia Arena

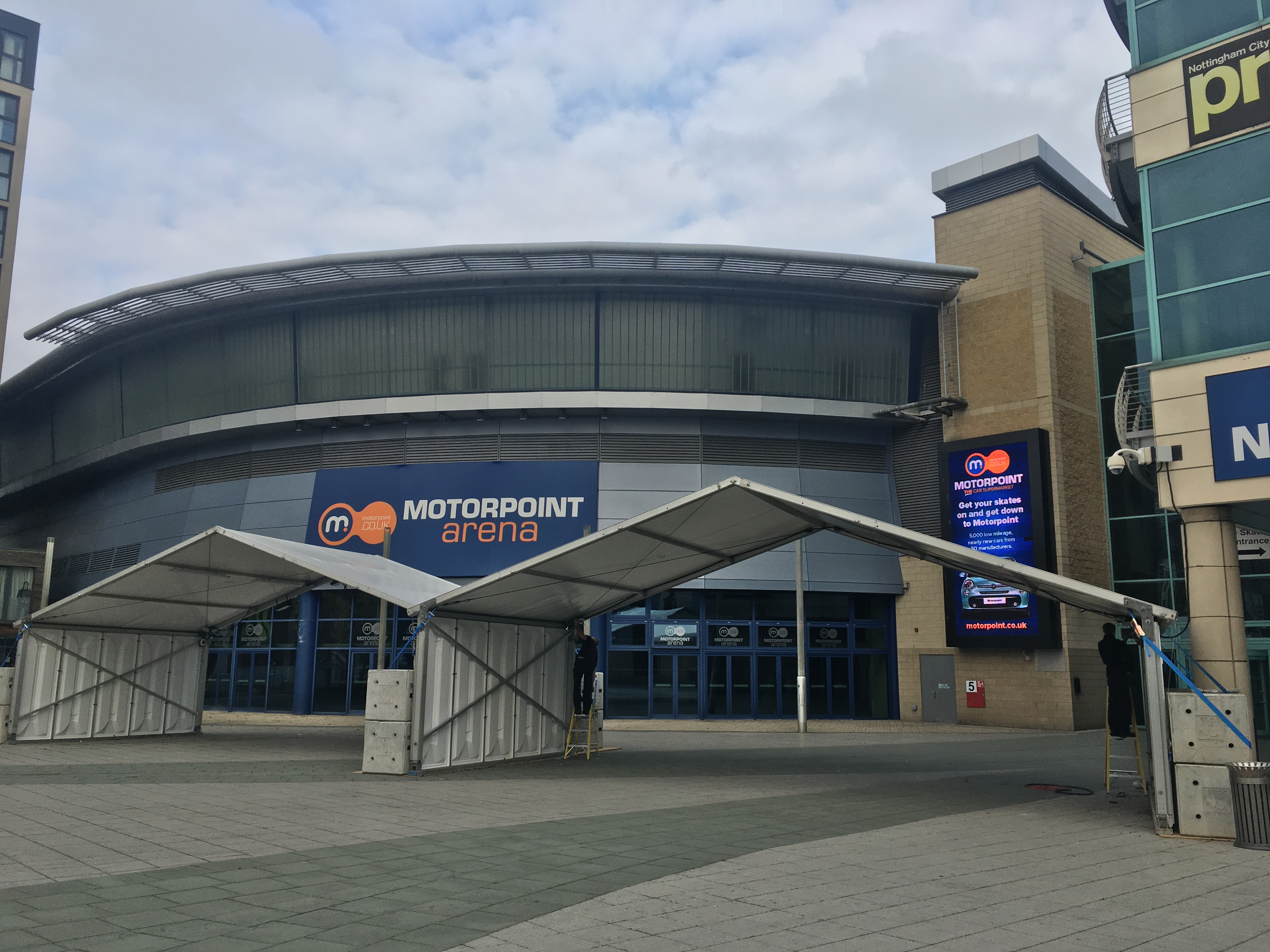
Nottingham Arena

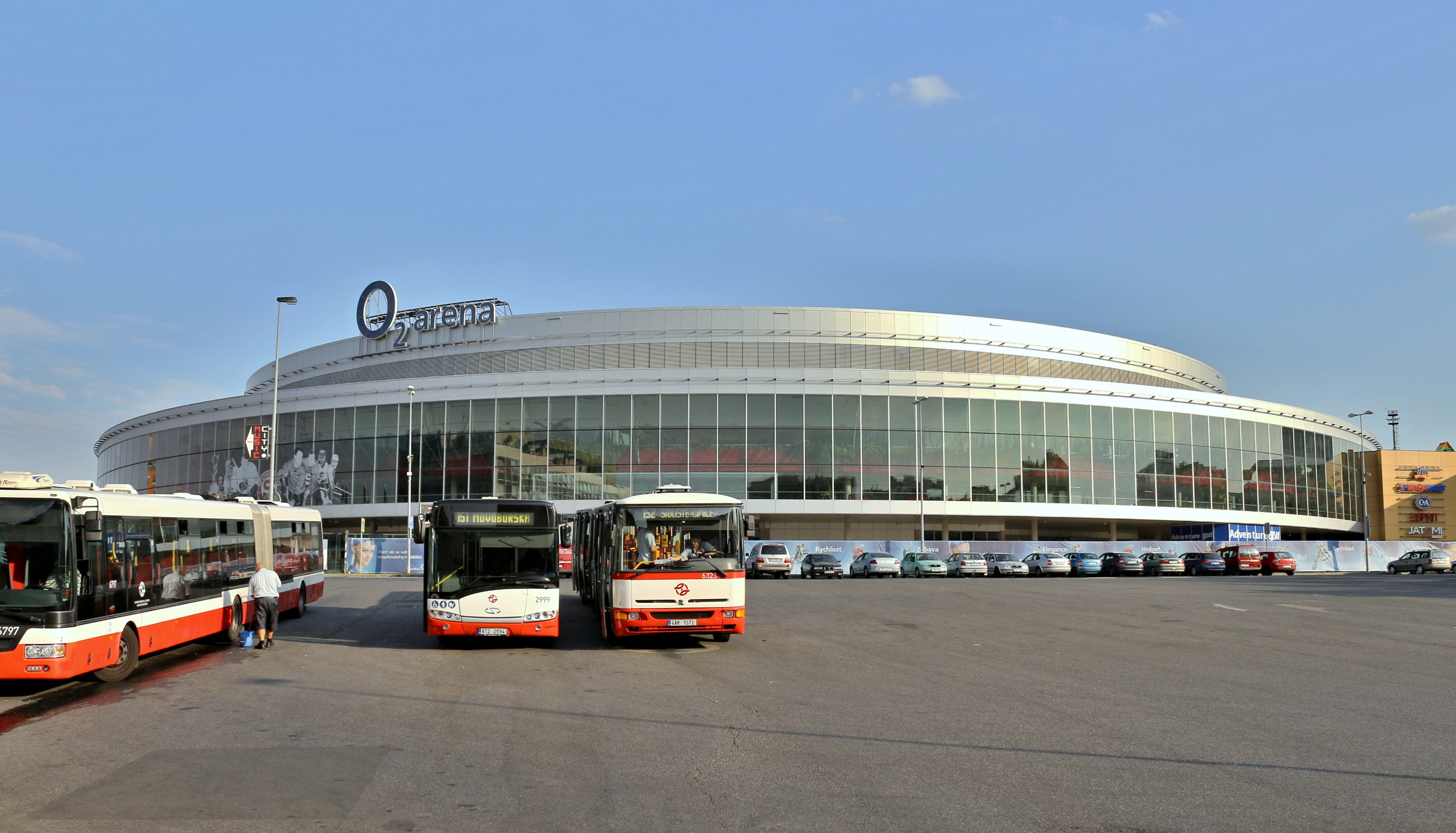
O2 Arena

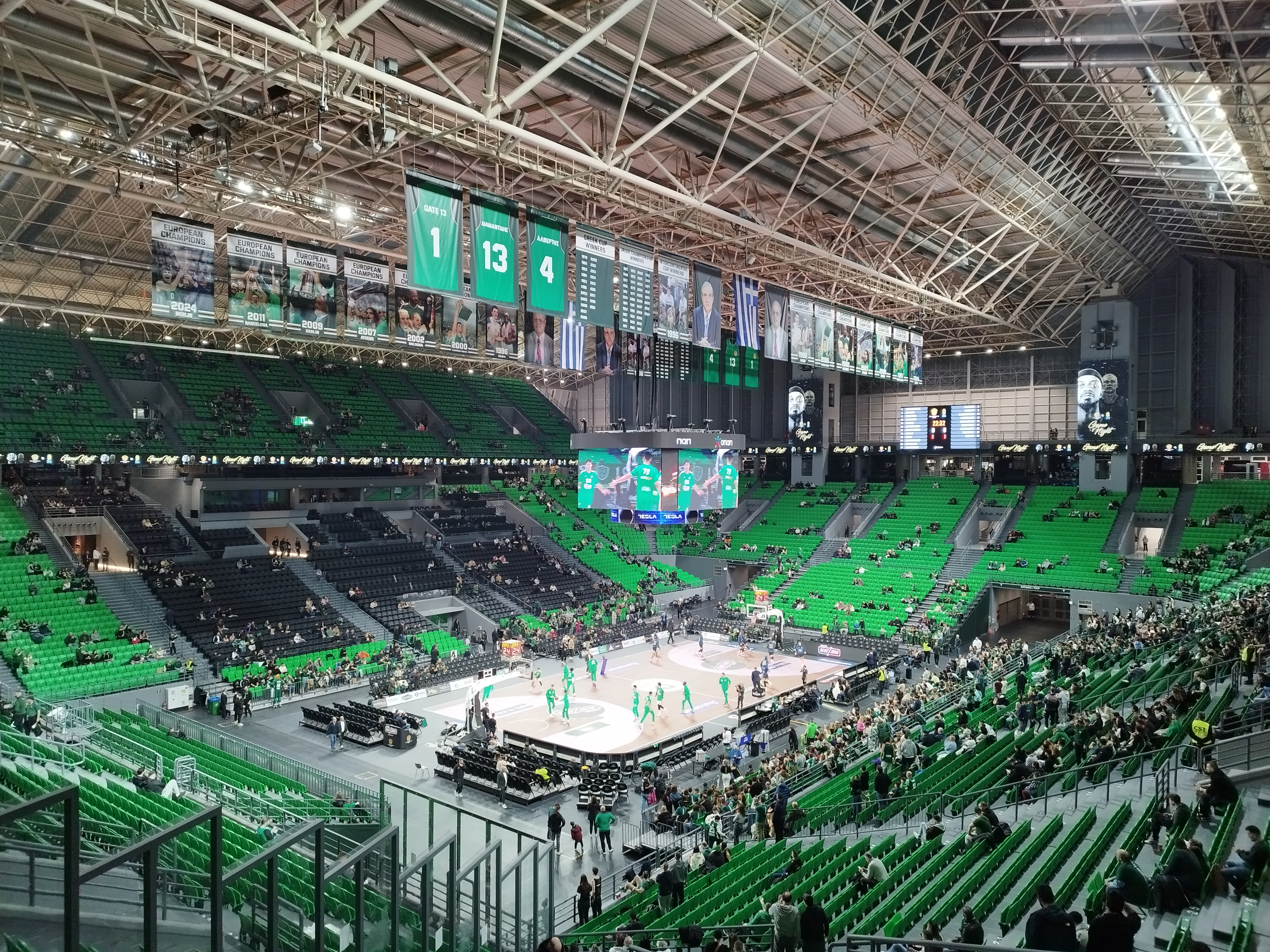
OAKA Basketball Arena

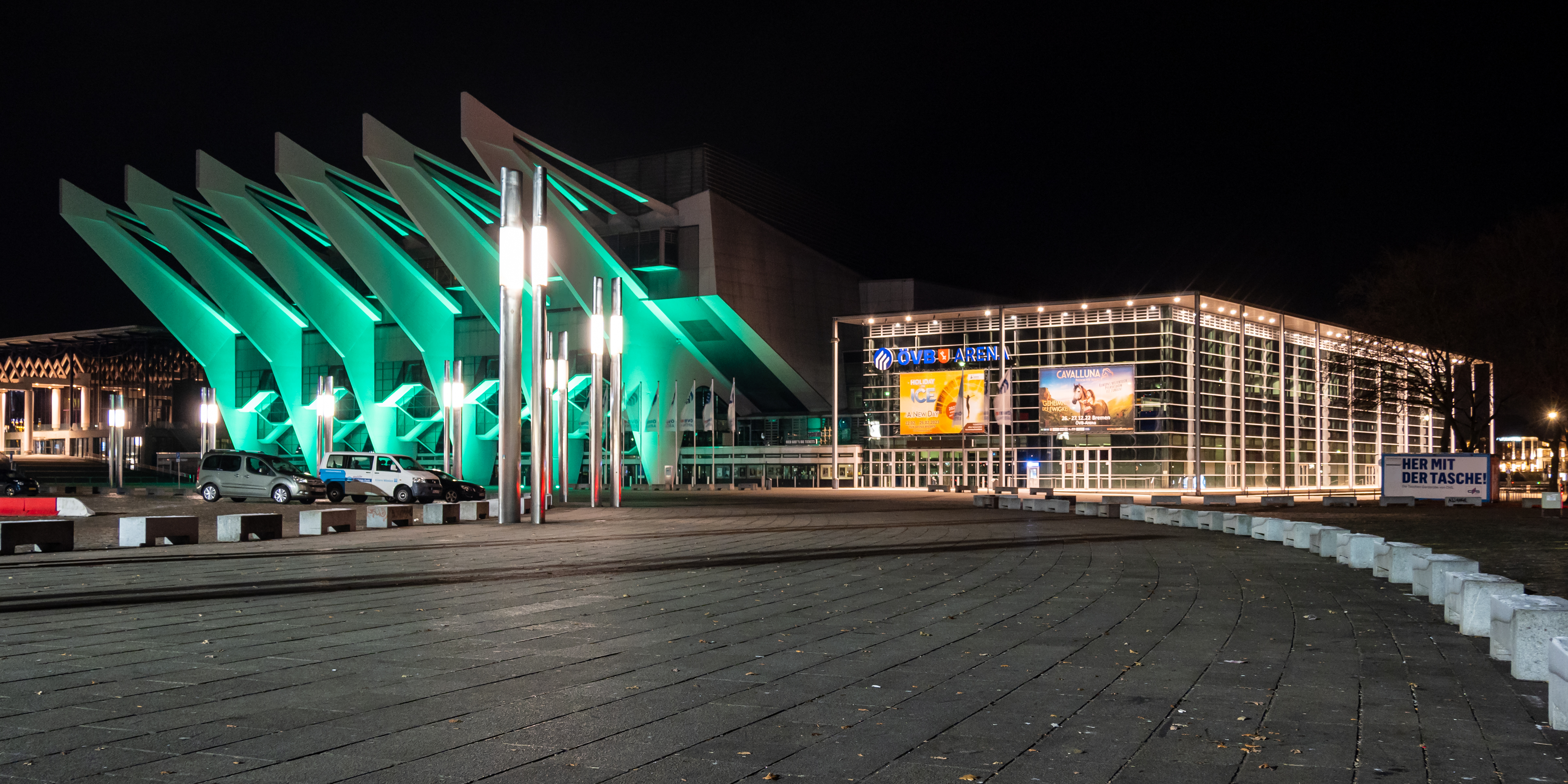
ÖVB Arena

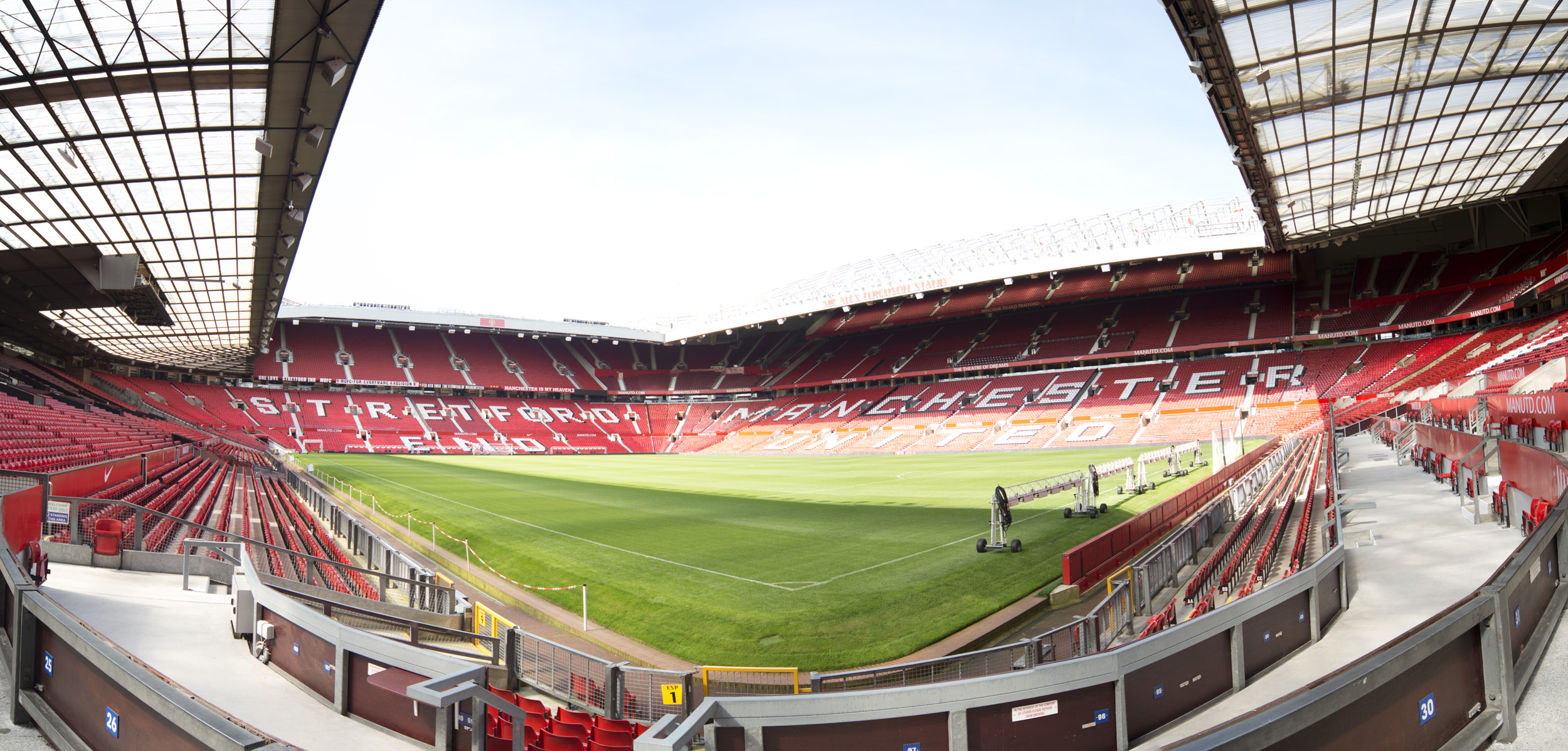
Old Trafford

Olympic Stadium of Athens

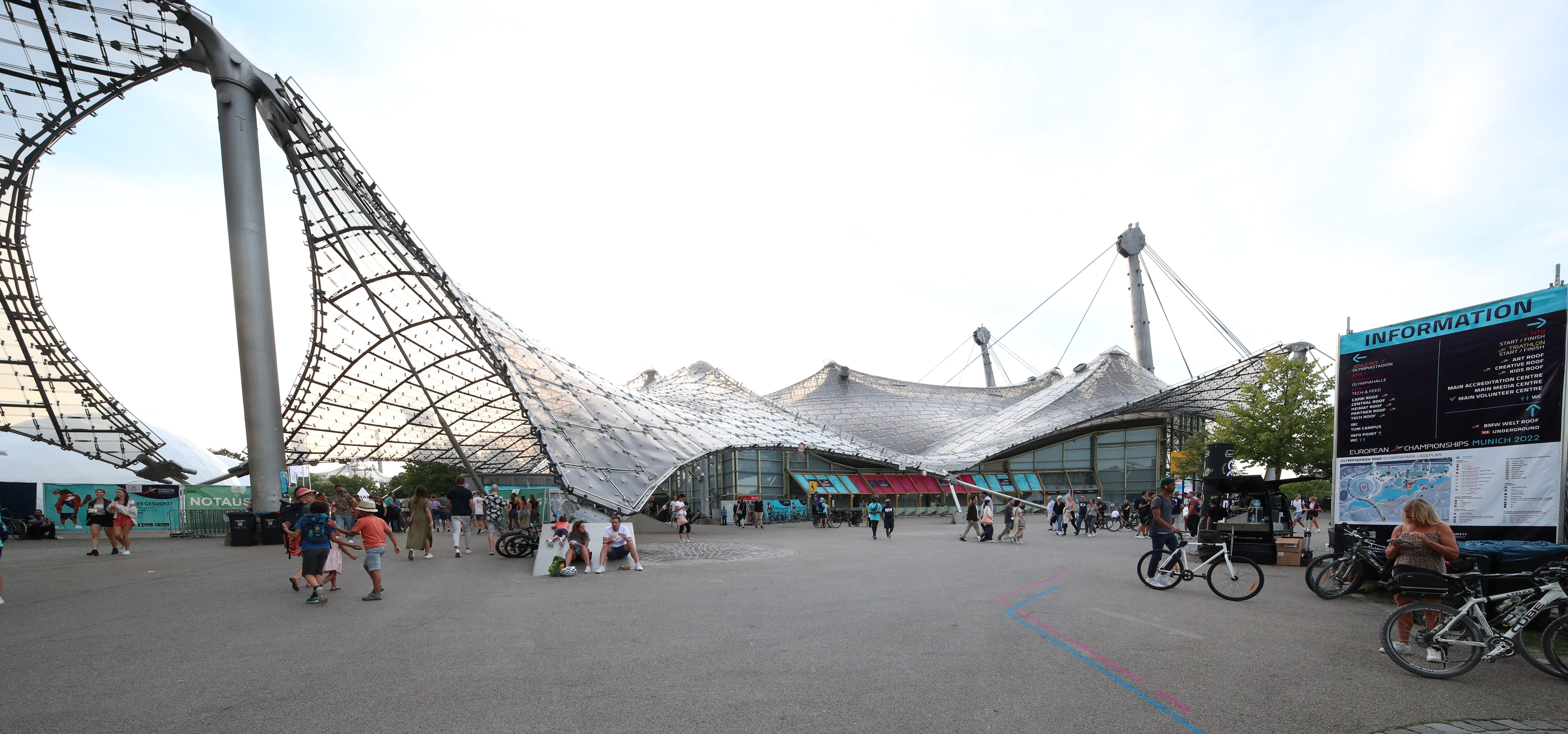
Olympiahalle

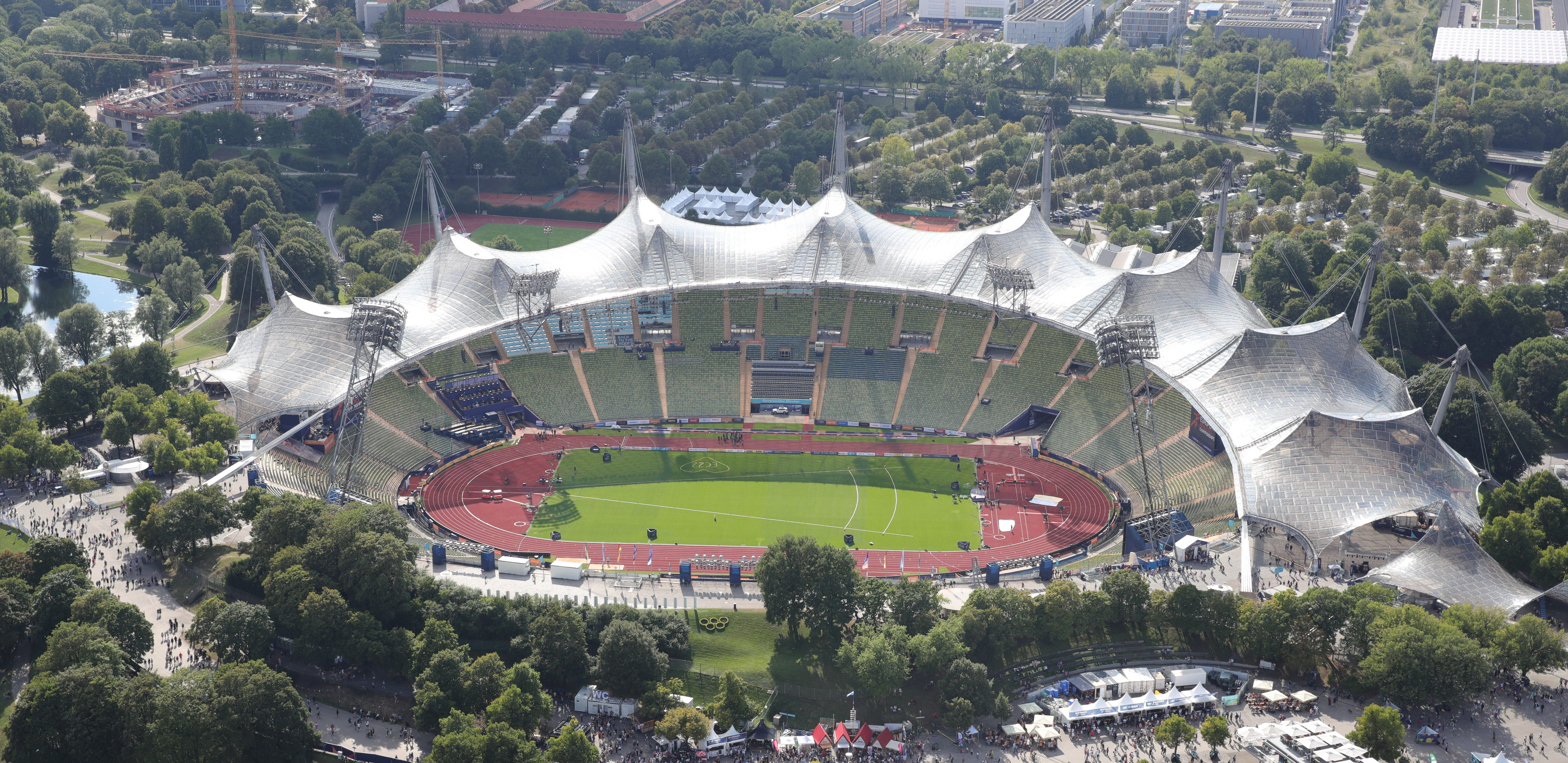
Olympiastadion

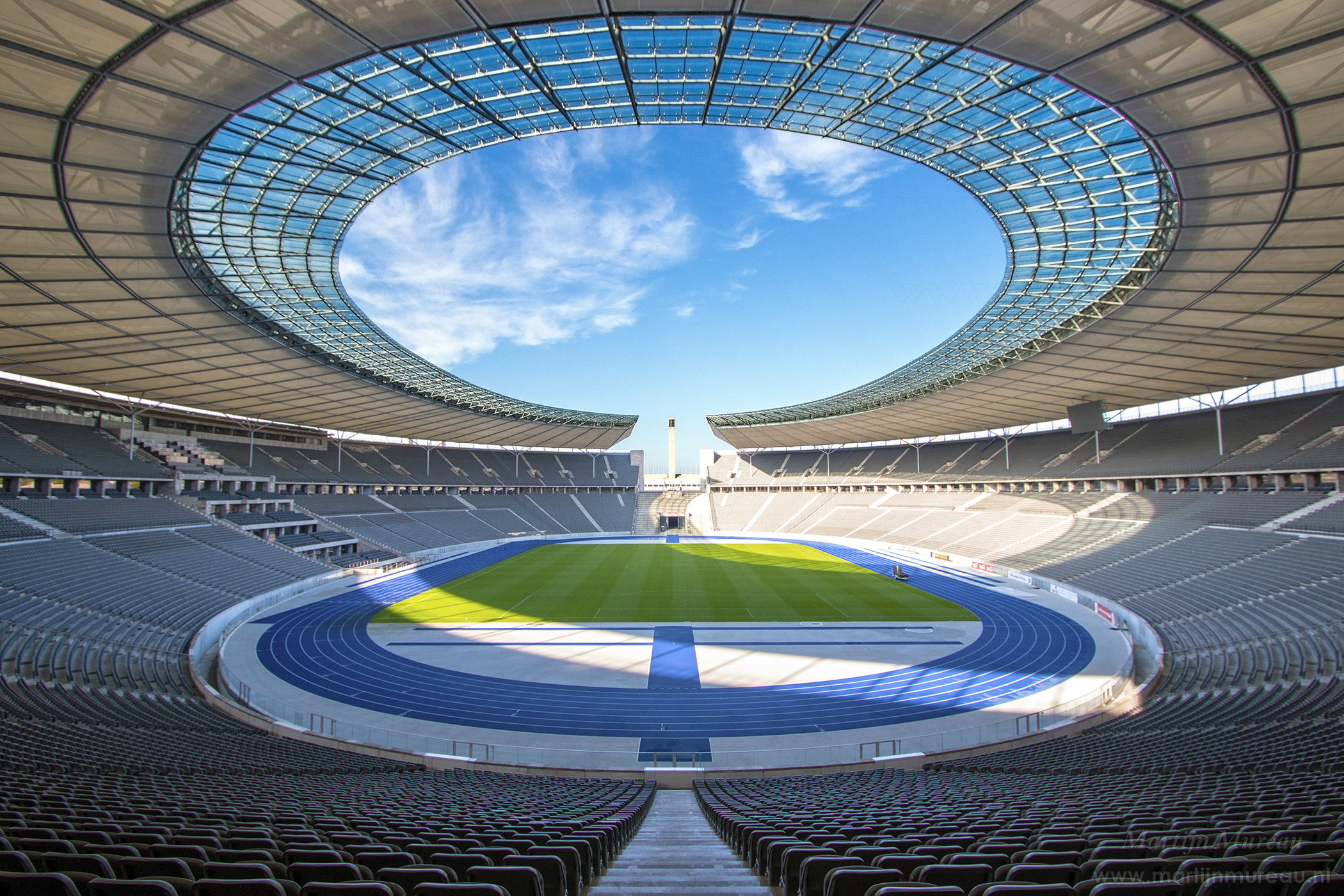
Olympiastadion

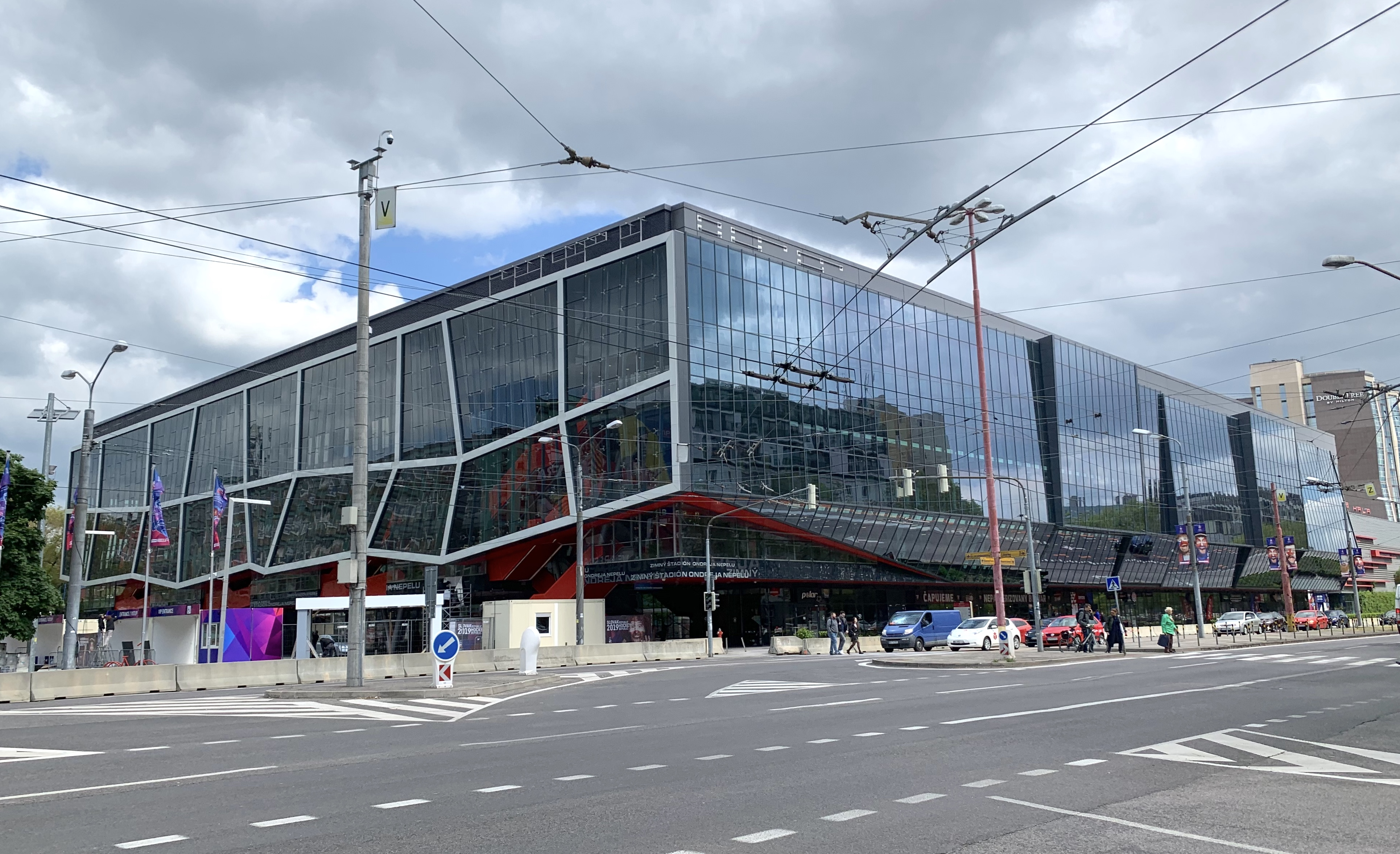
Ondrej Nepela Arena

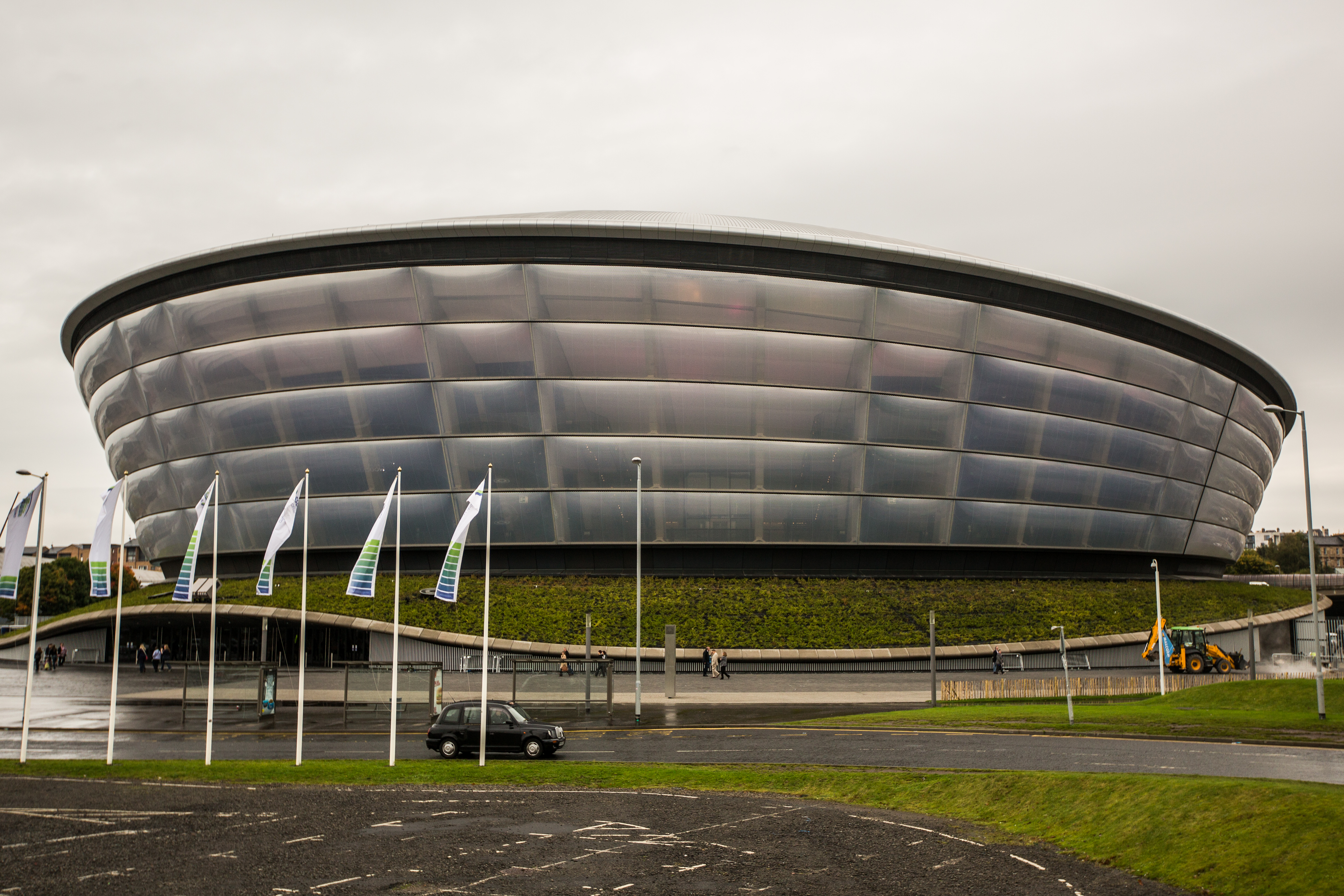
OVO Hydro

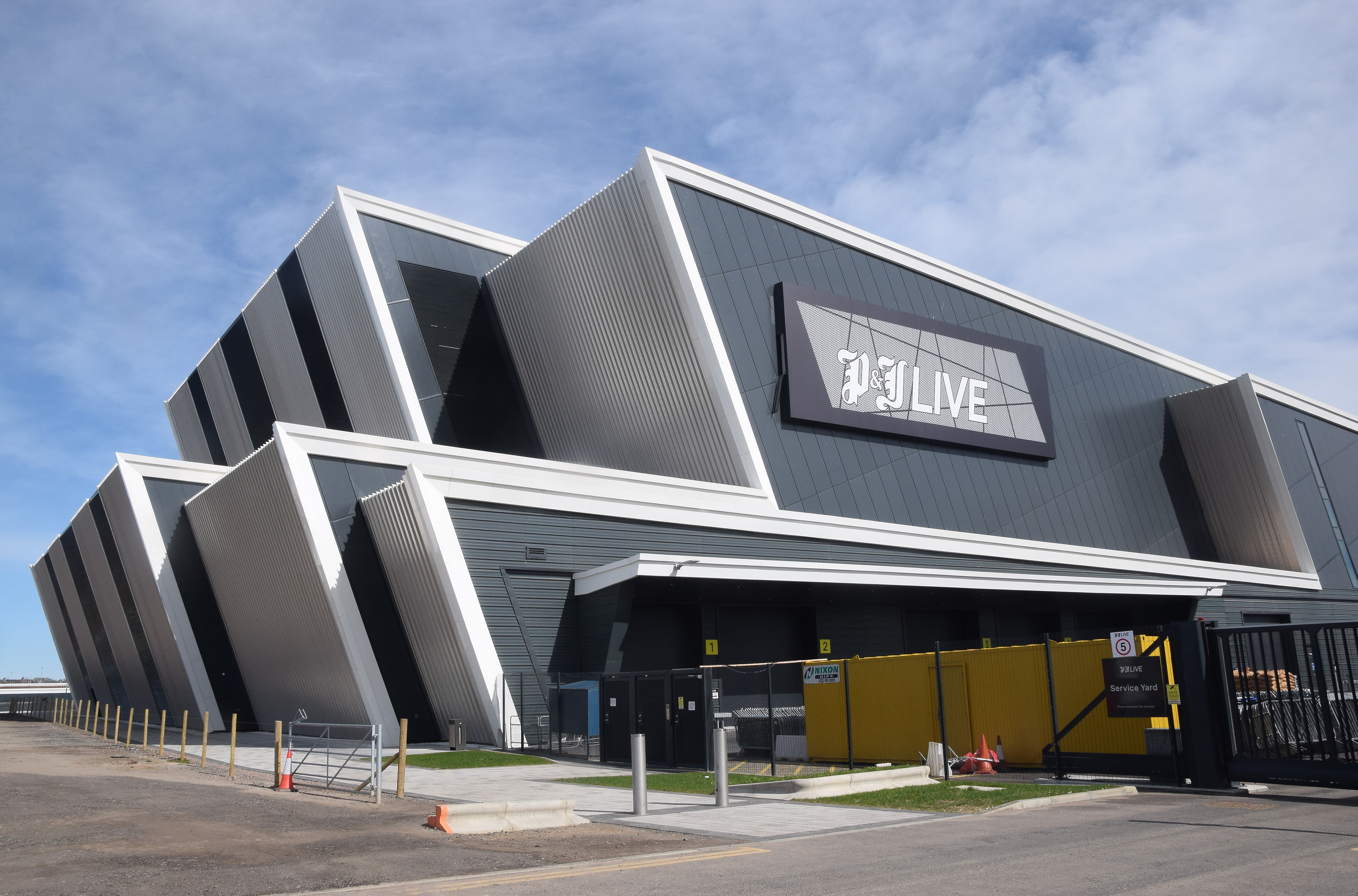
P&J Live

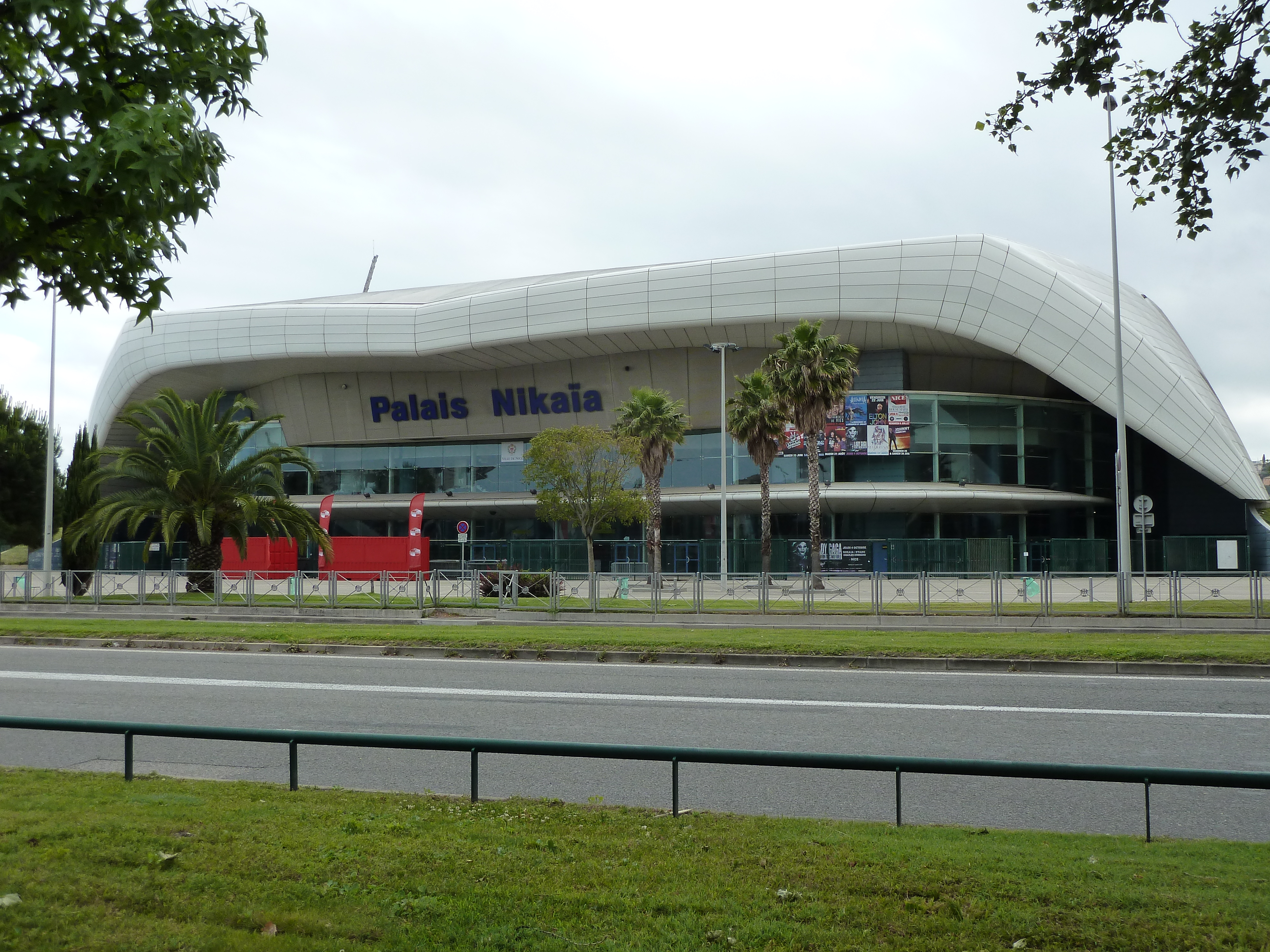
Palais Nikaïa

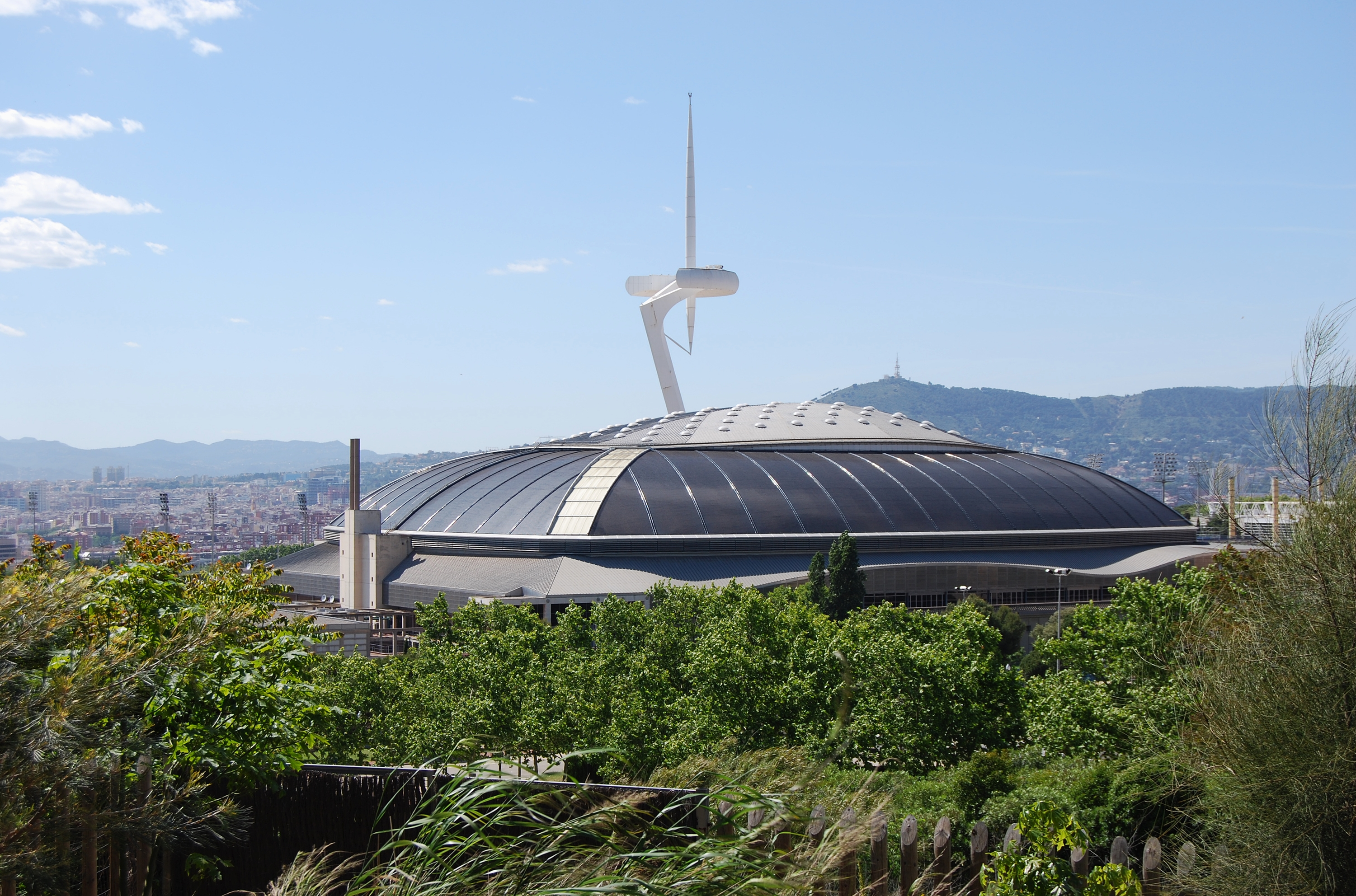
Palau Sant Jordi

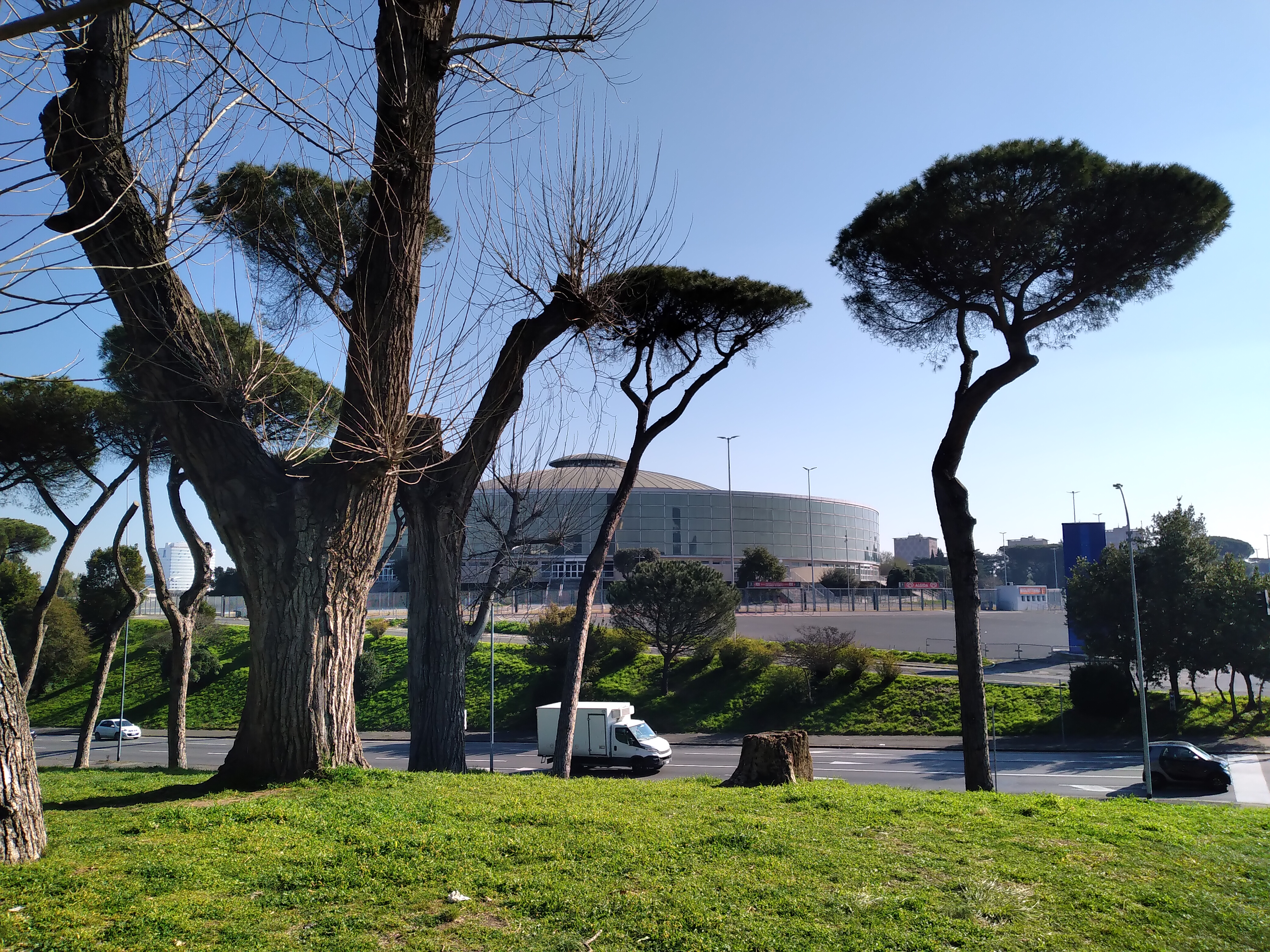
Palazzetto dello Sport

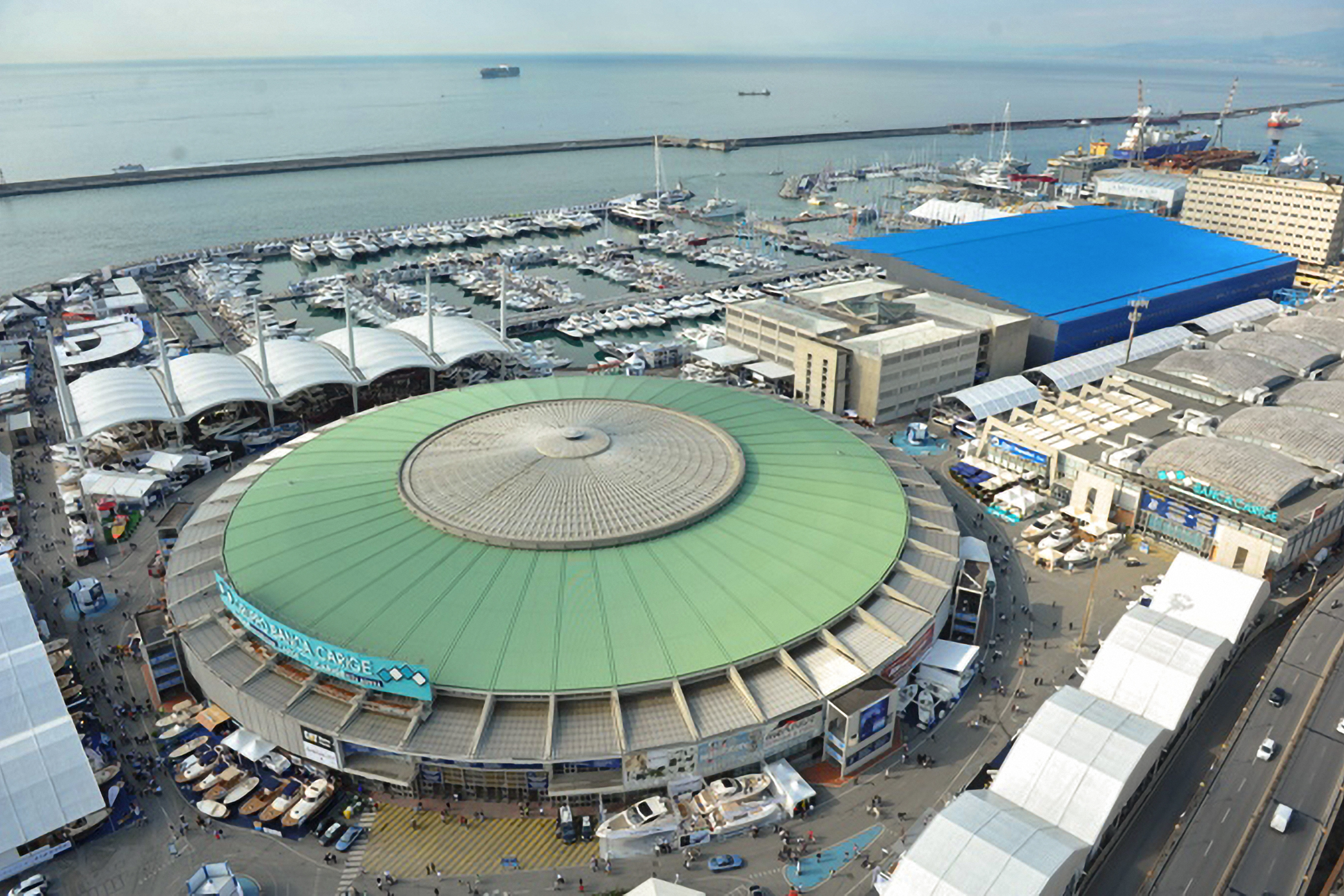
Palasport di Genova

Parc des Princes

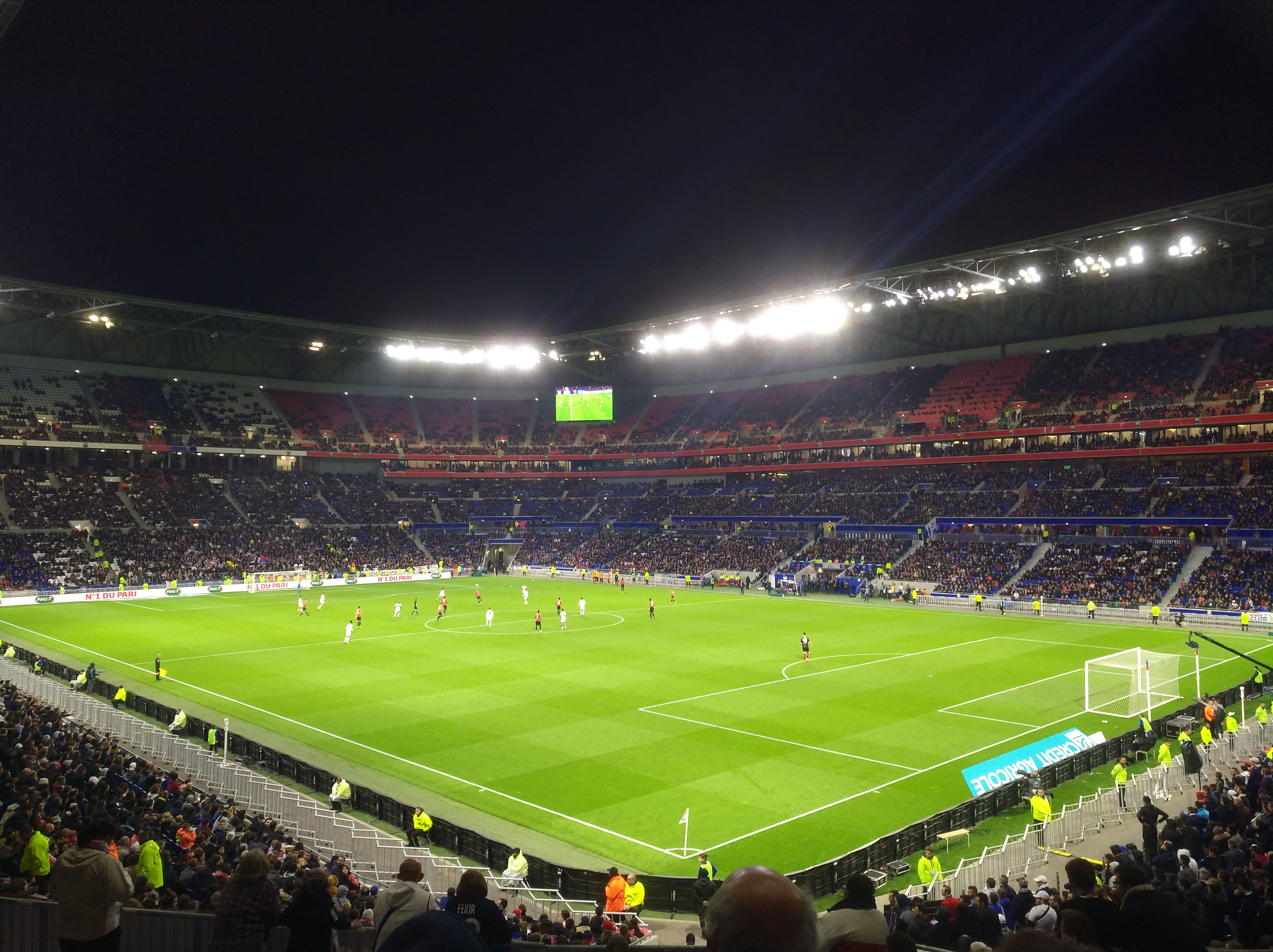
Parc Olympique Lyonnais

Paris La Défense Arena

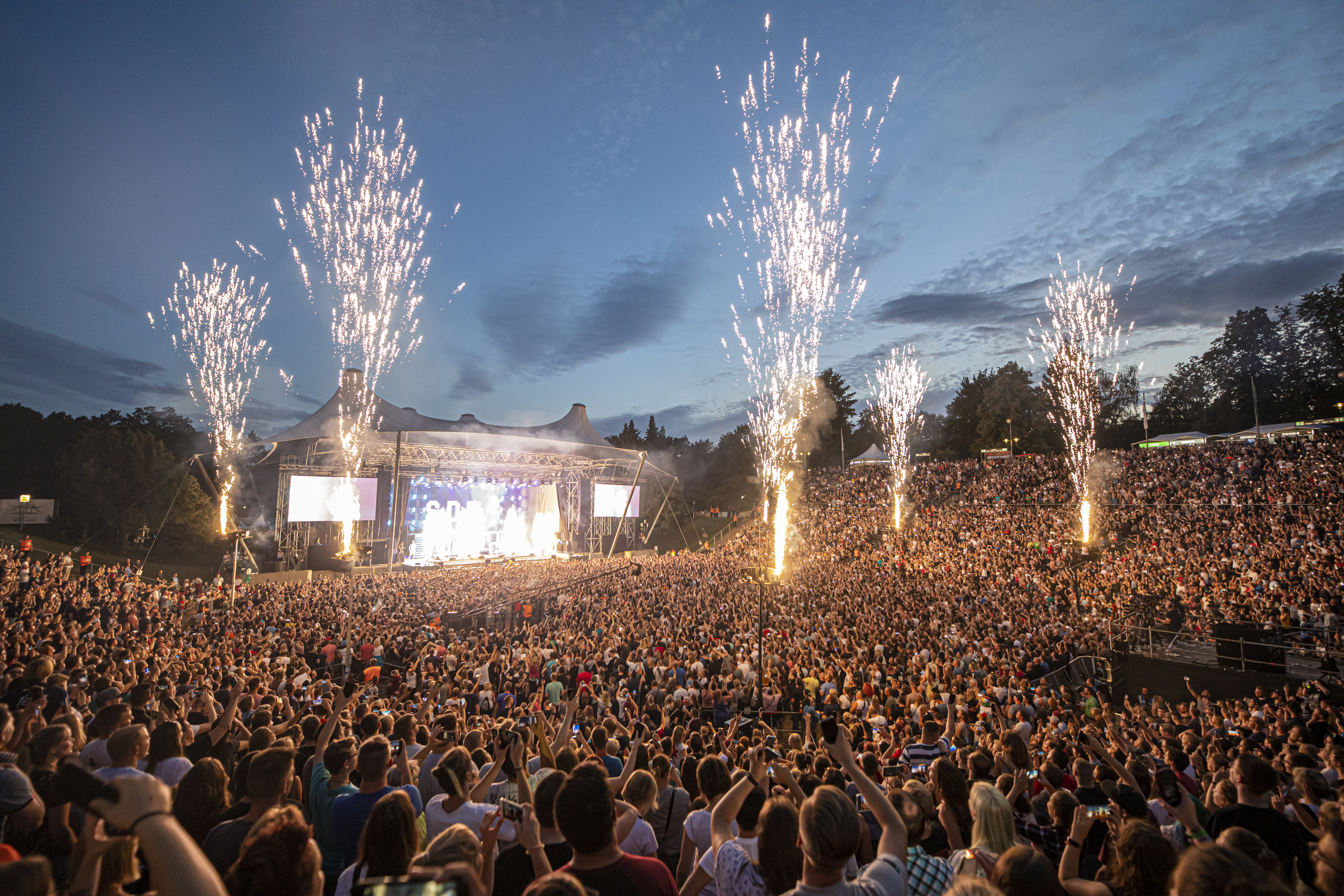
Parkbühne Wuhlheide

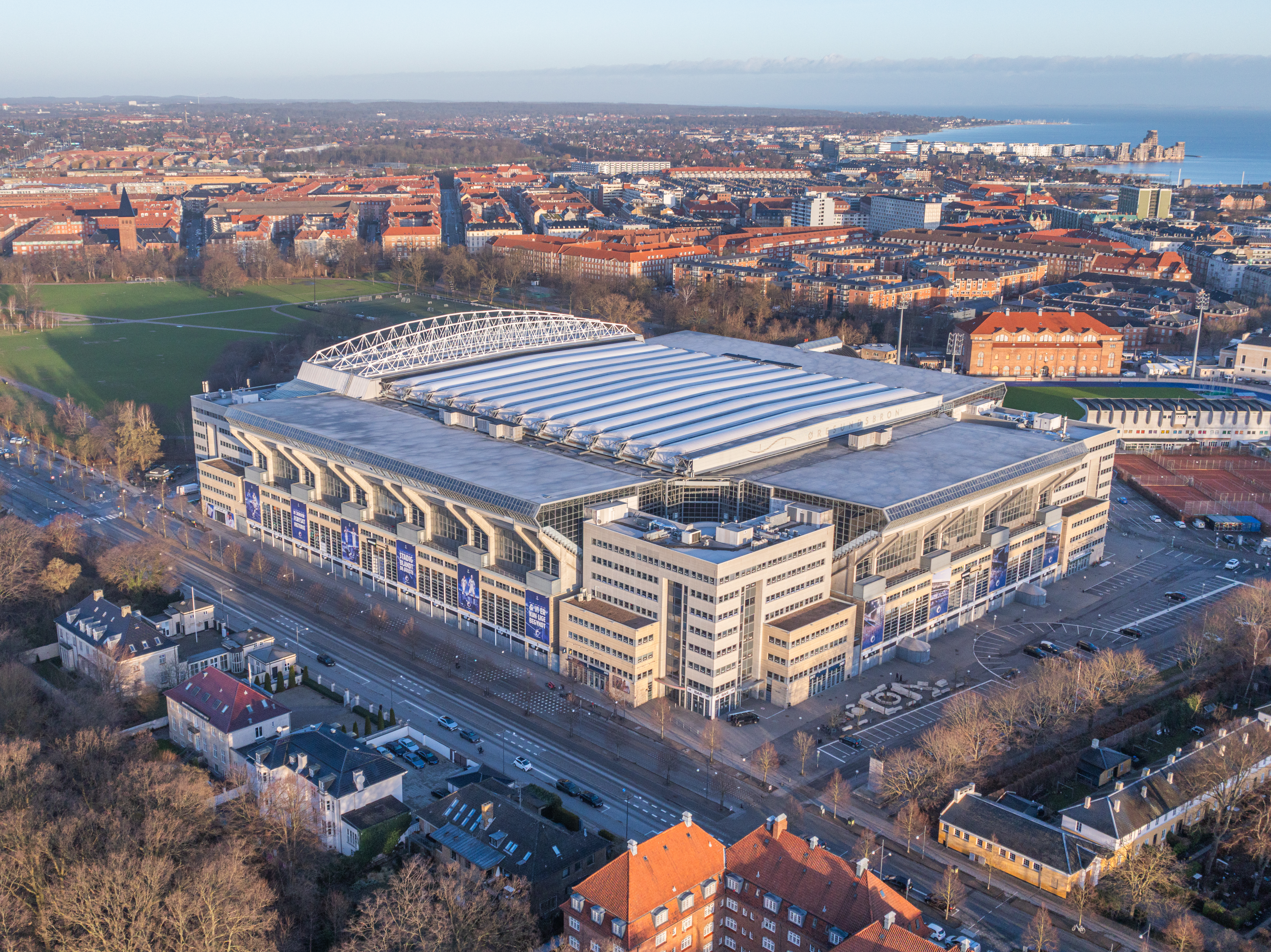
Parken Stadium

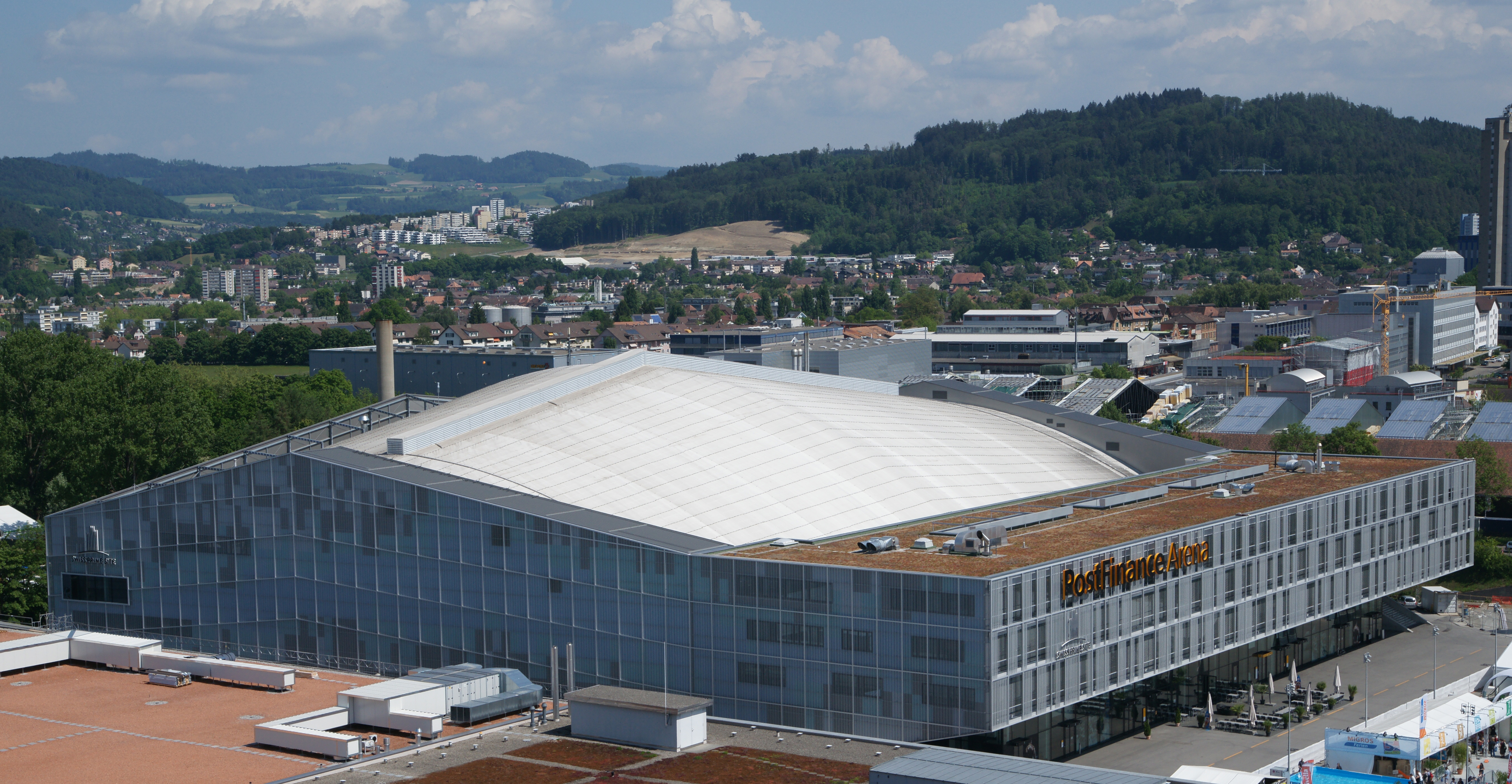
PostFinance Arena

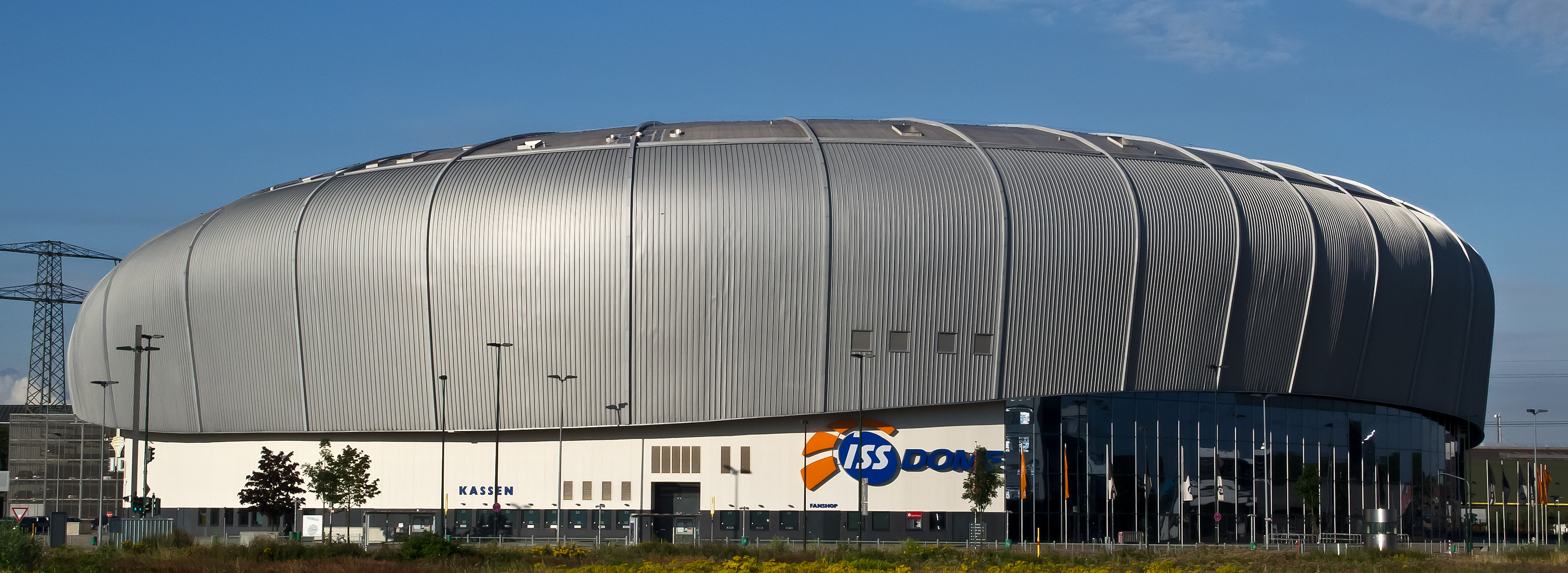
PSD Bank Dome

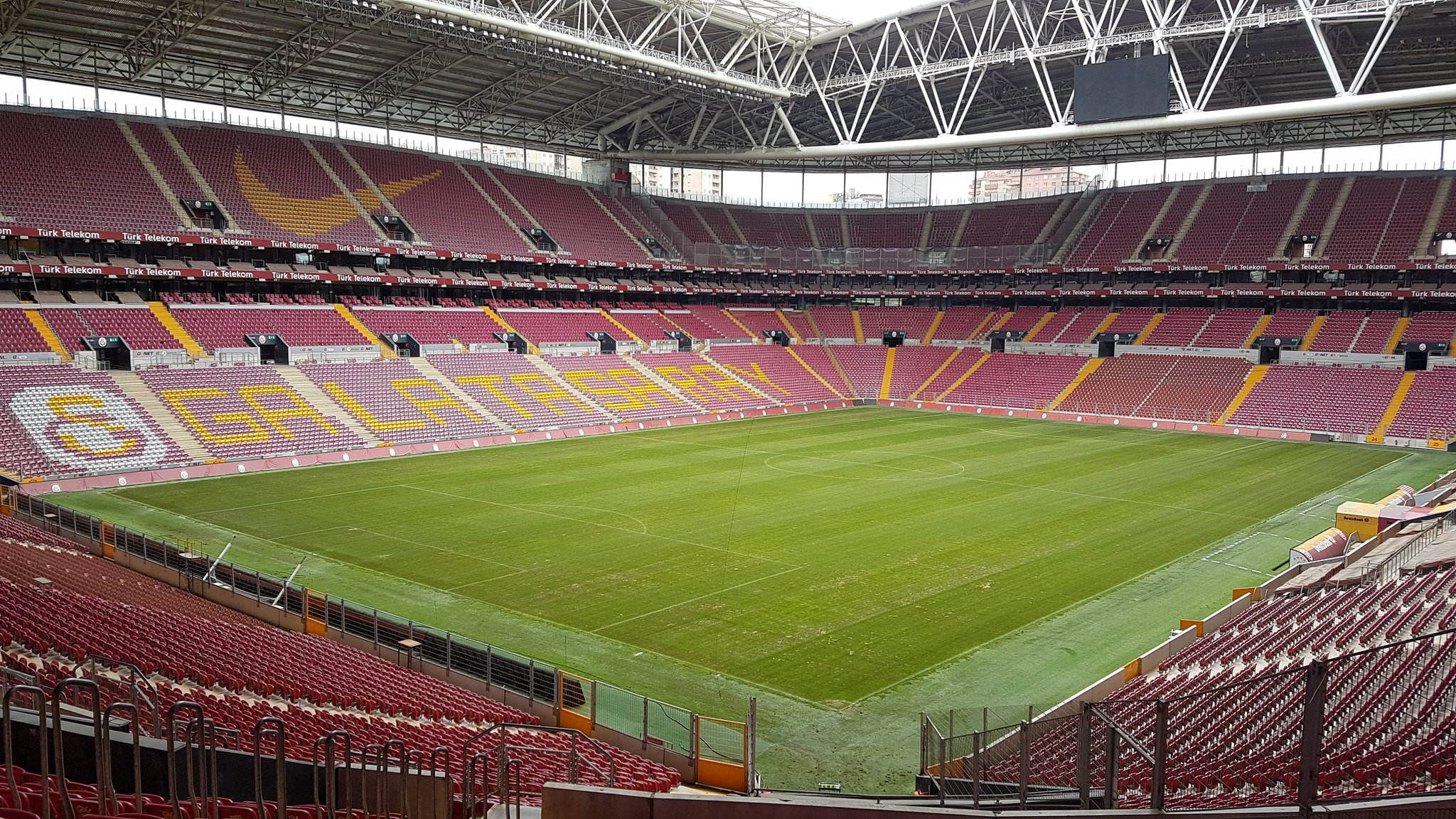
Rams Park

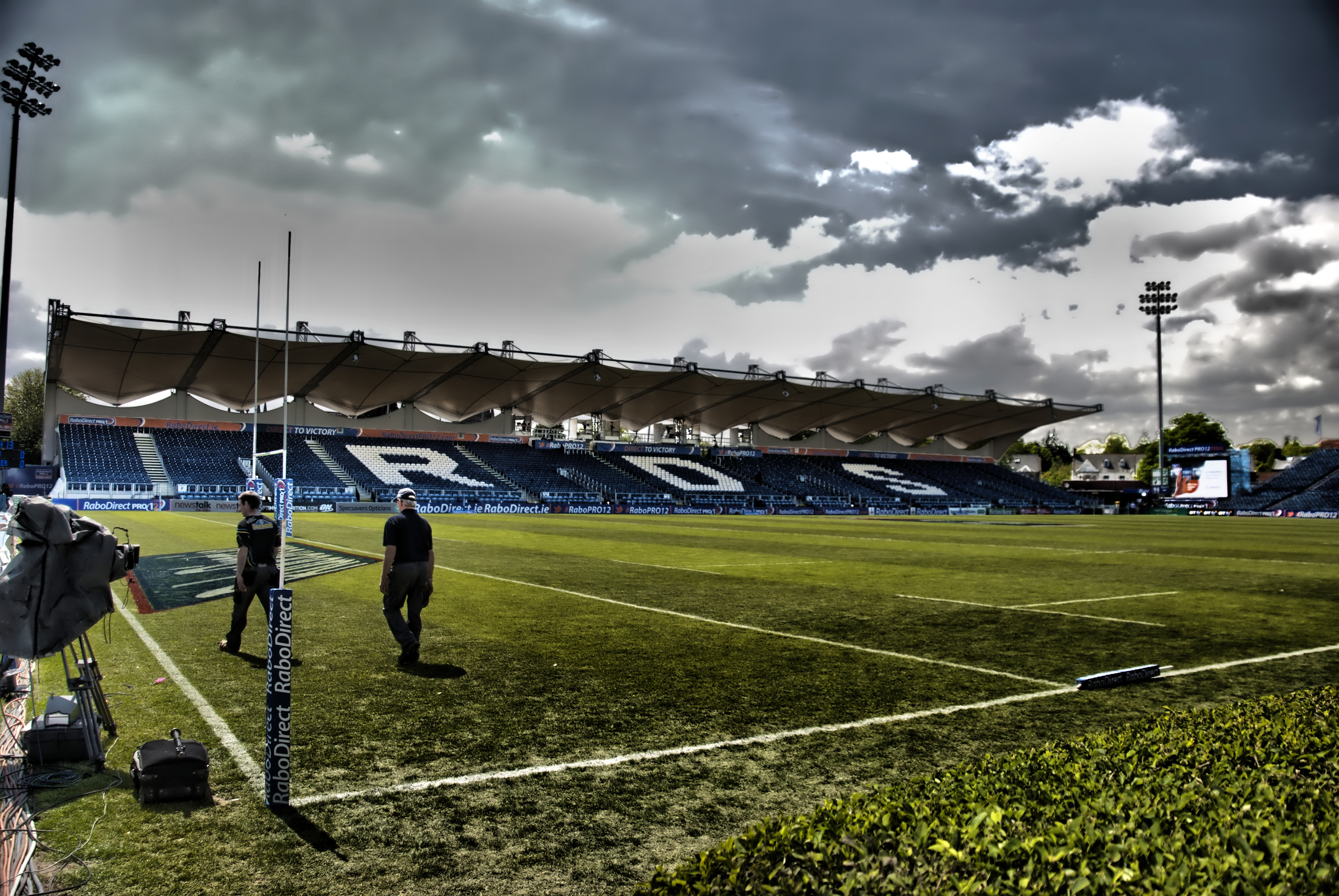
RDS Arena

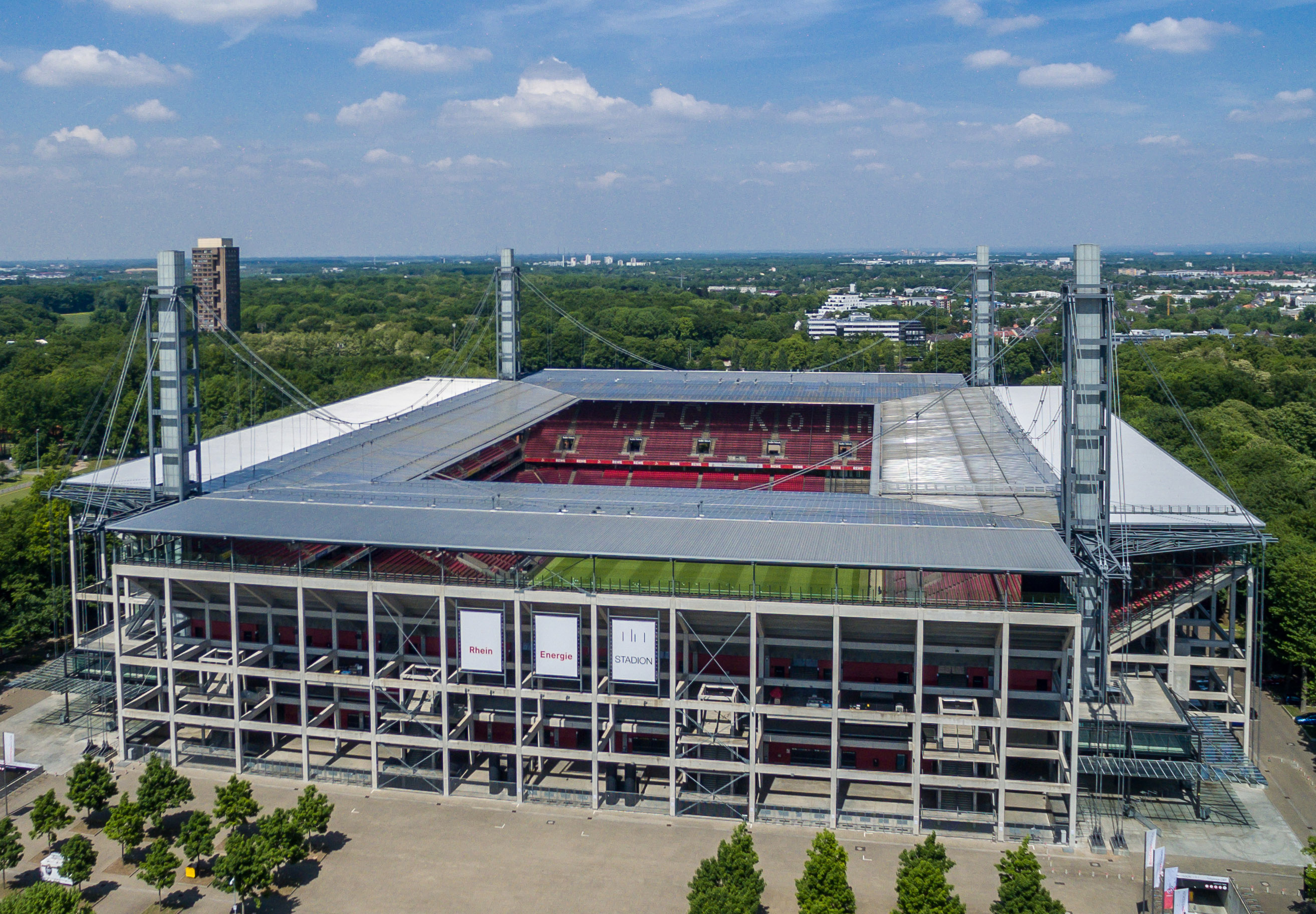
RheinEnergieStadion

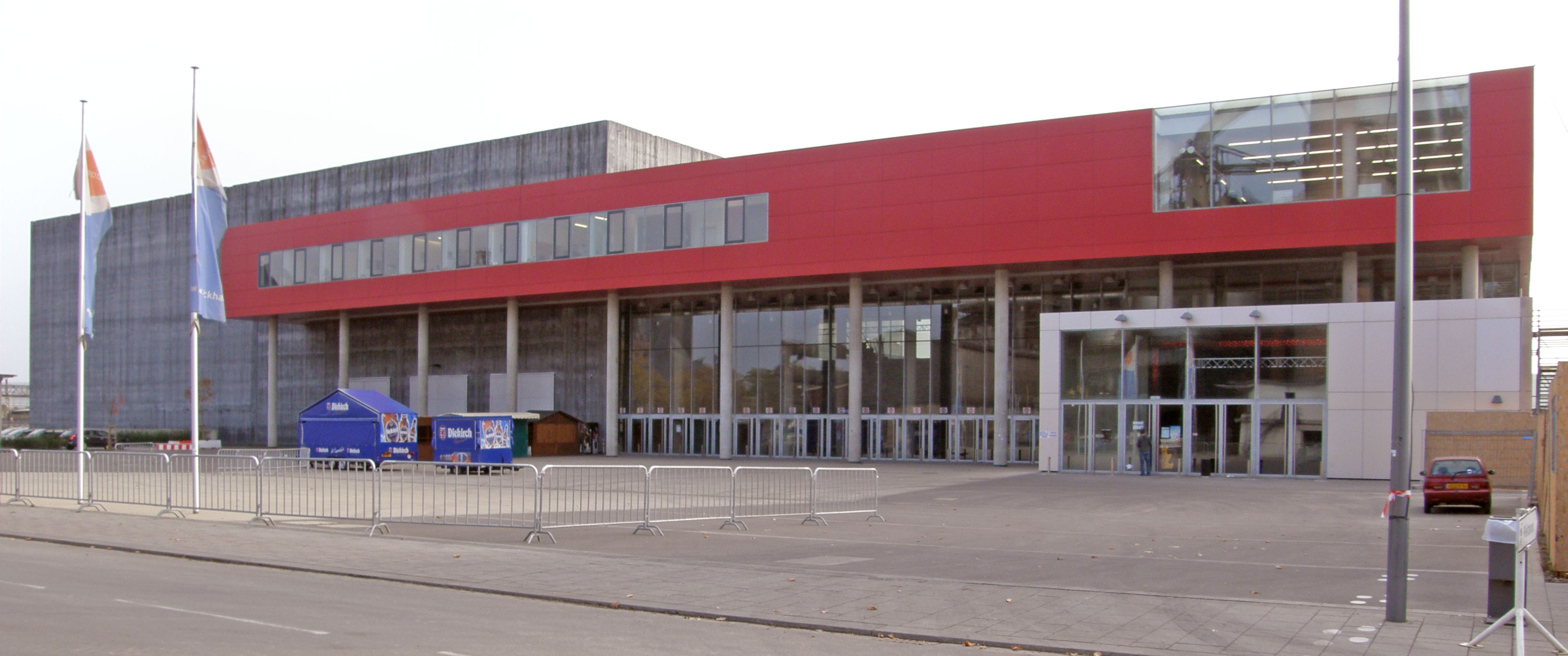
Rockhal

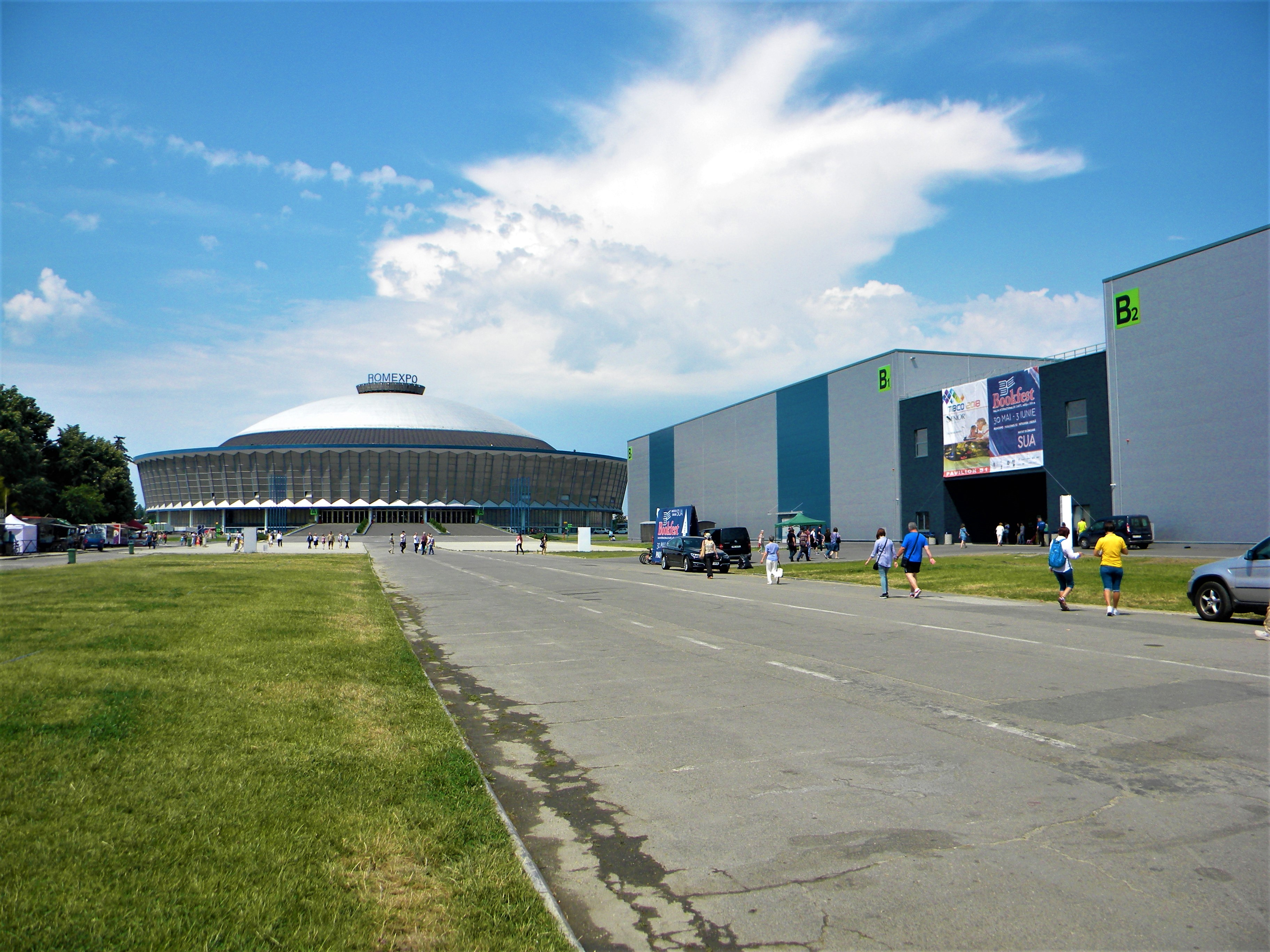
Romexpo

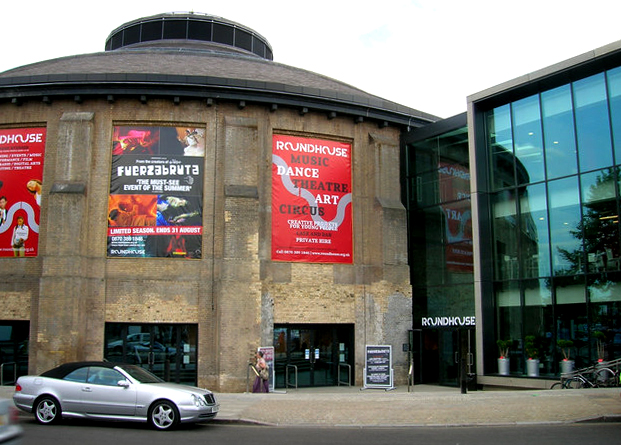
Roundhouse

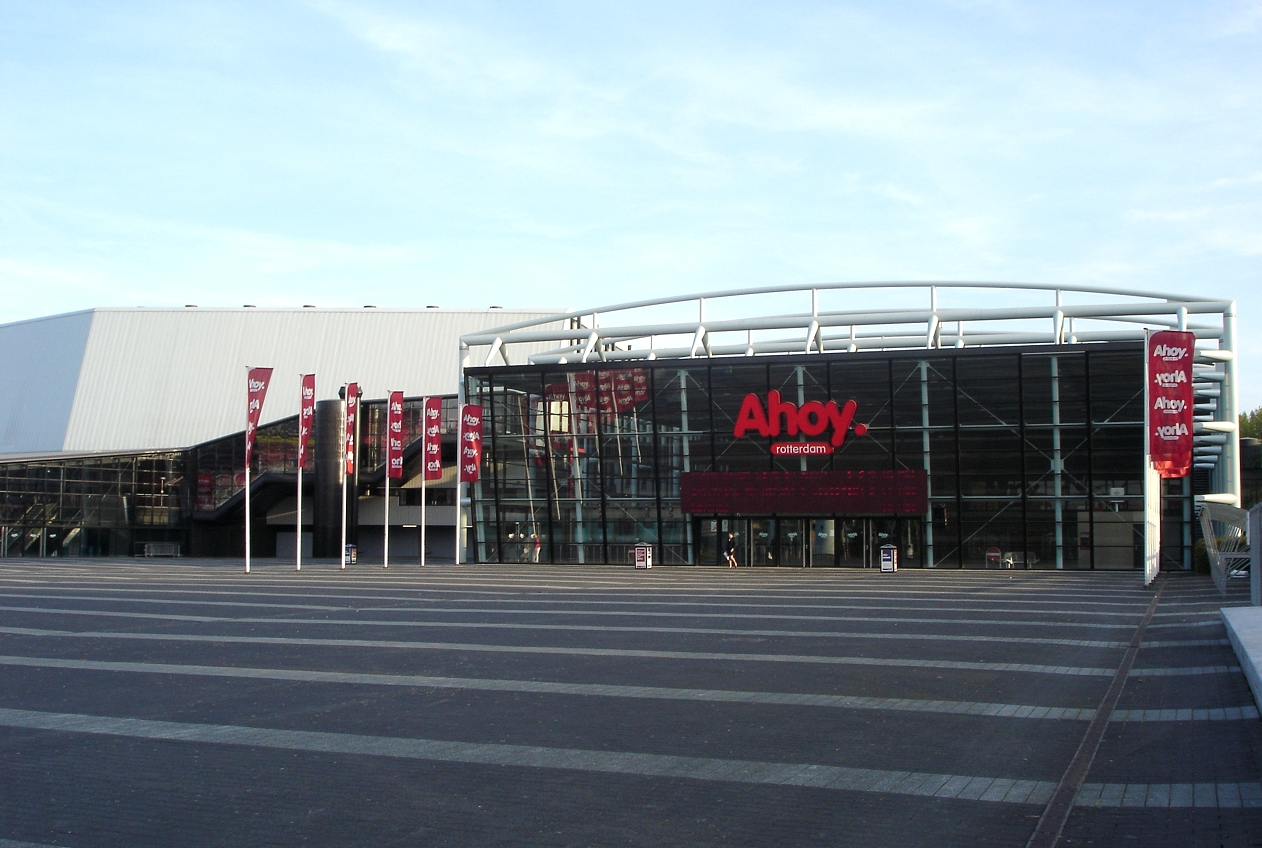
Rotterdam Ahoy

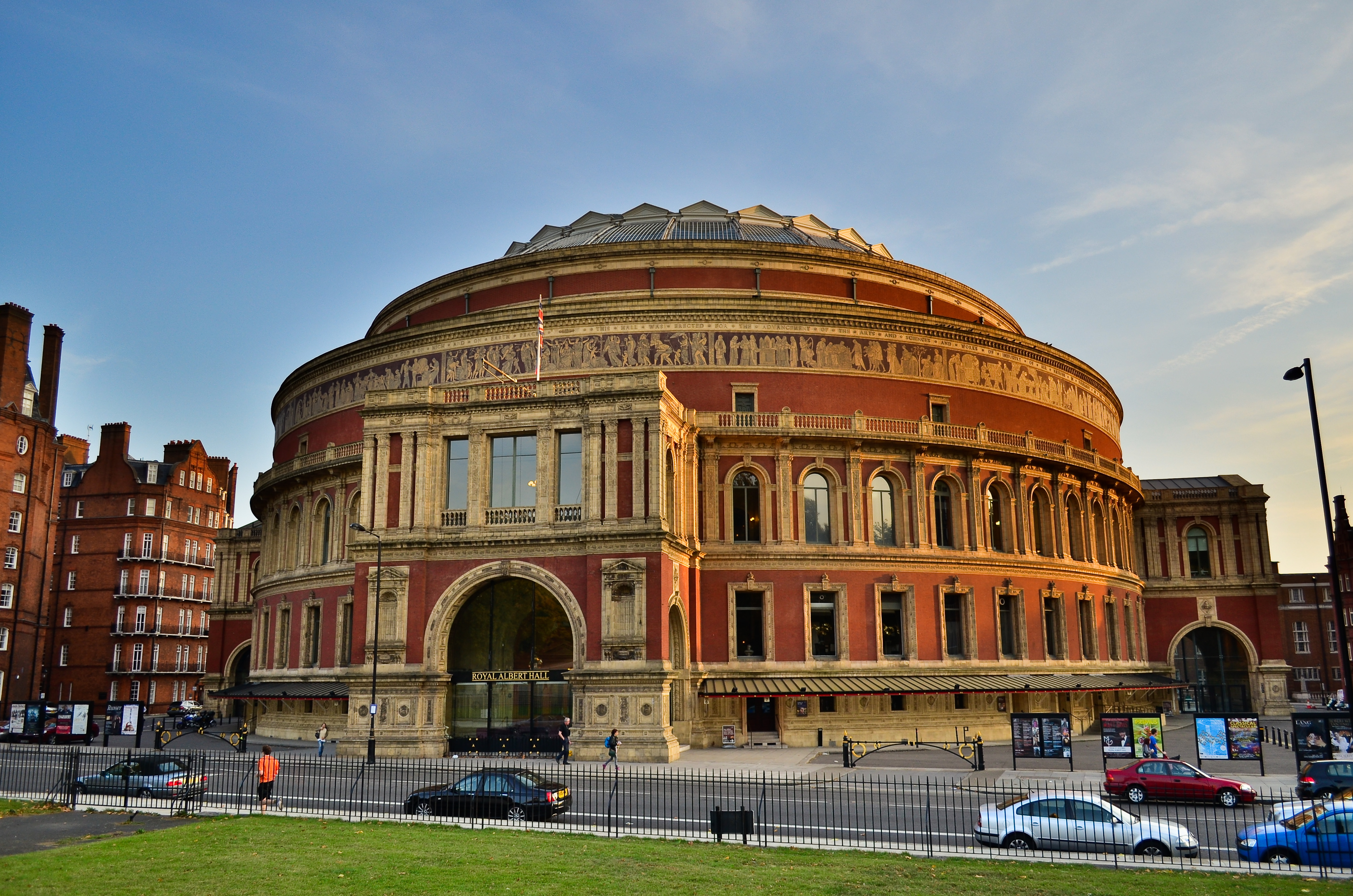
Royal Albert Hall

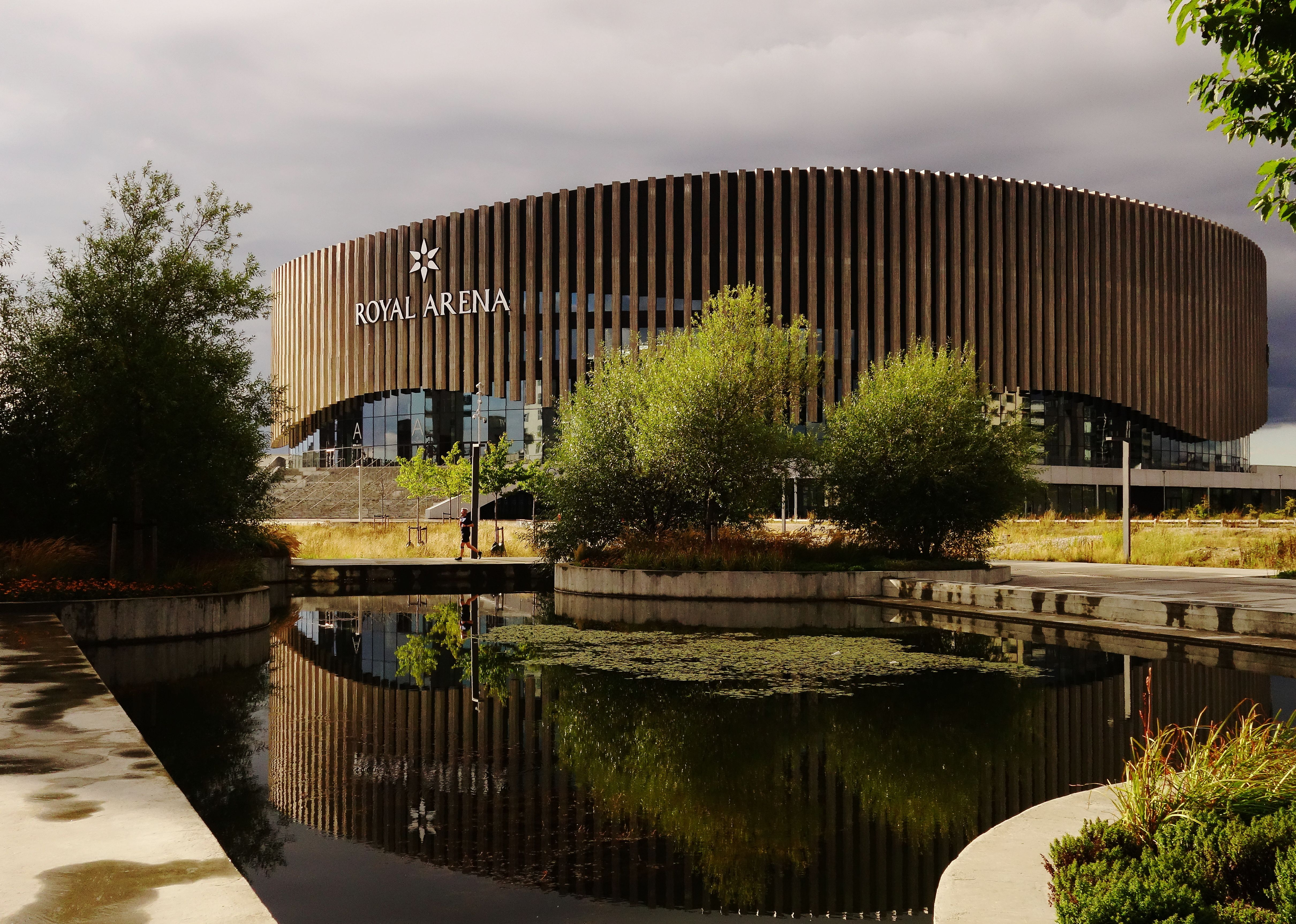
Royal Arena

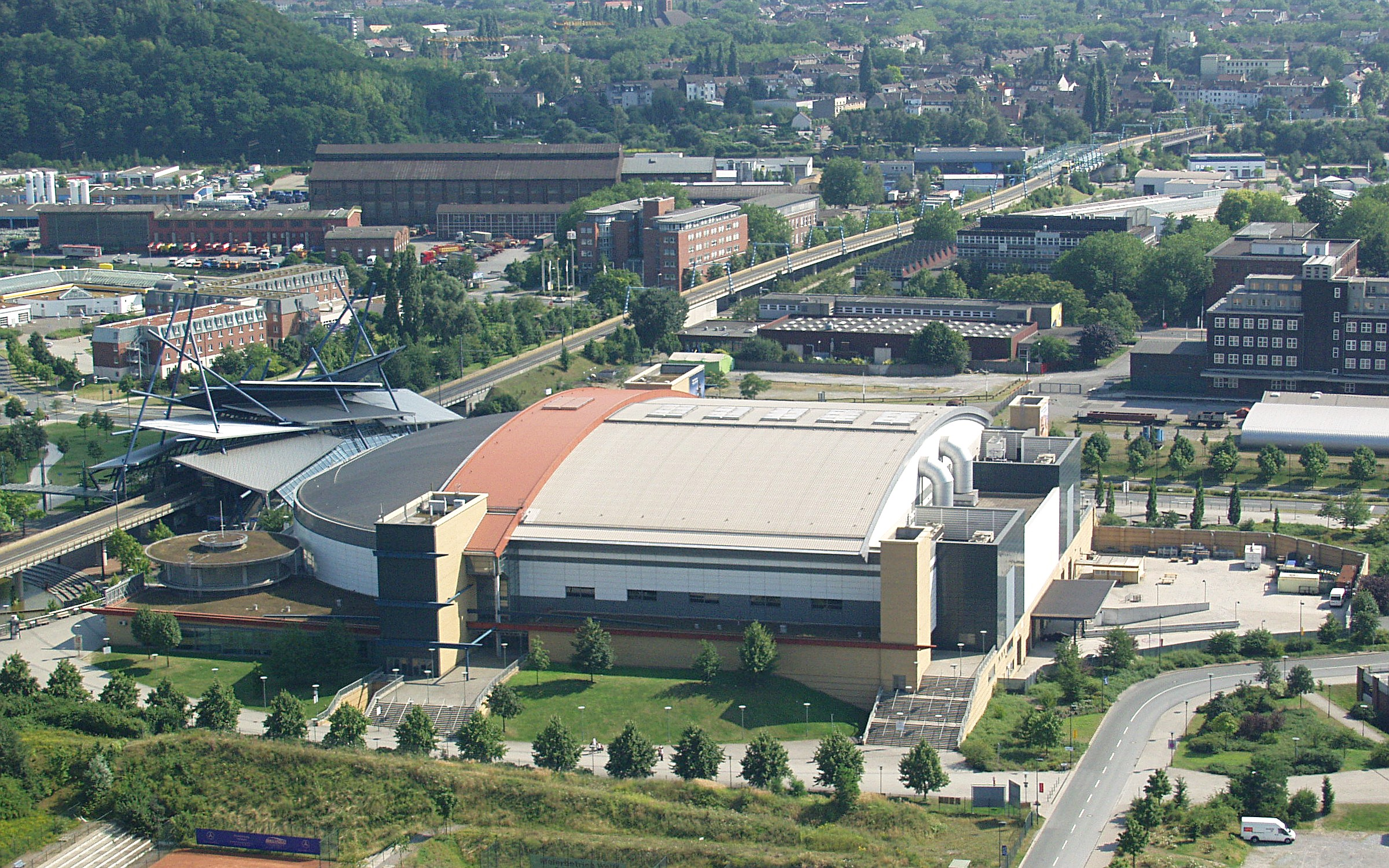
Rudolf Weber-Arena

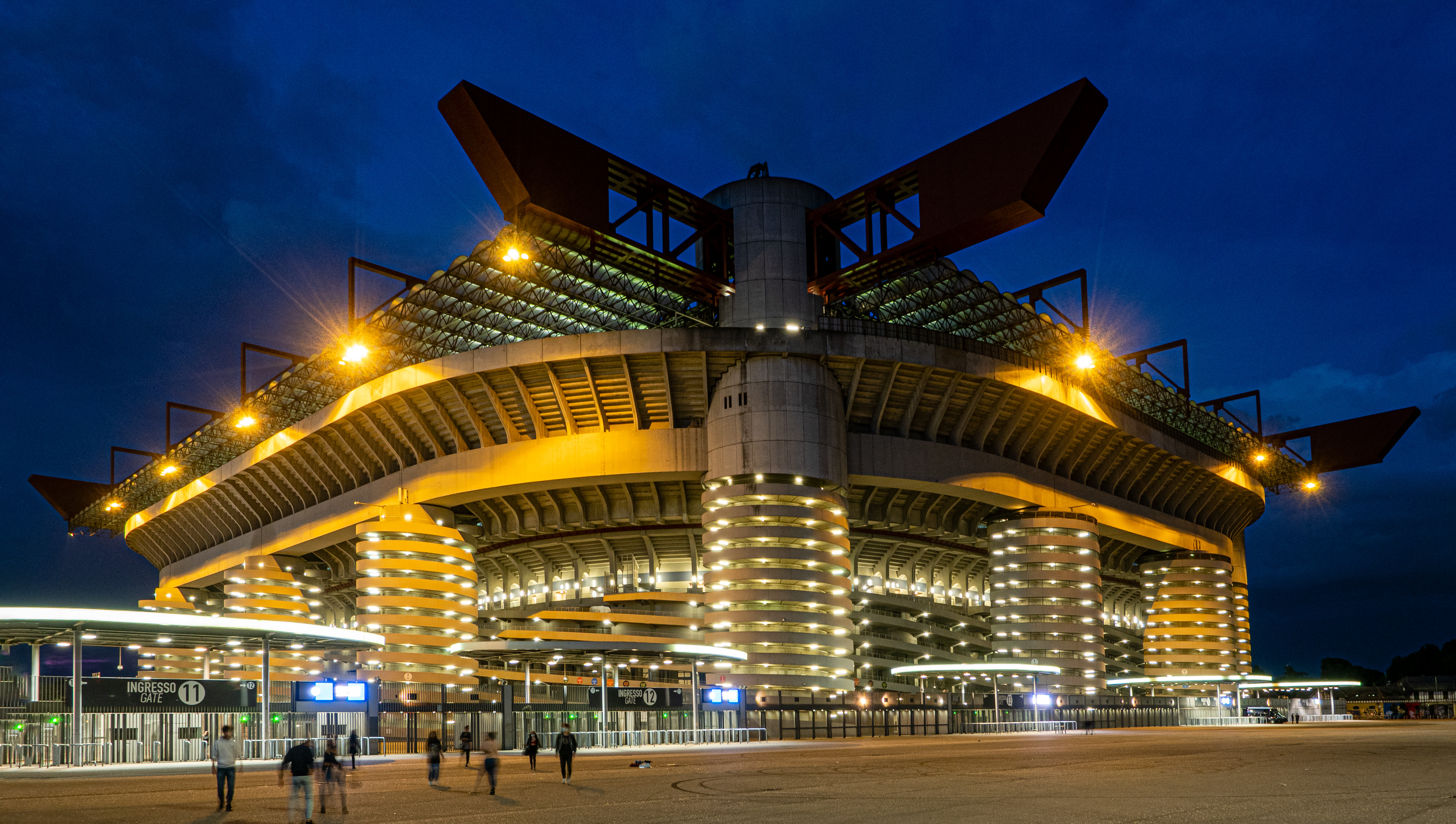
San Siro

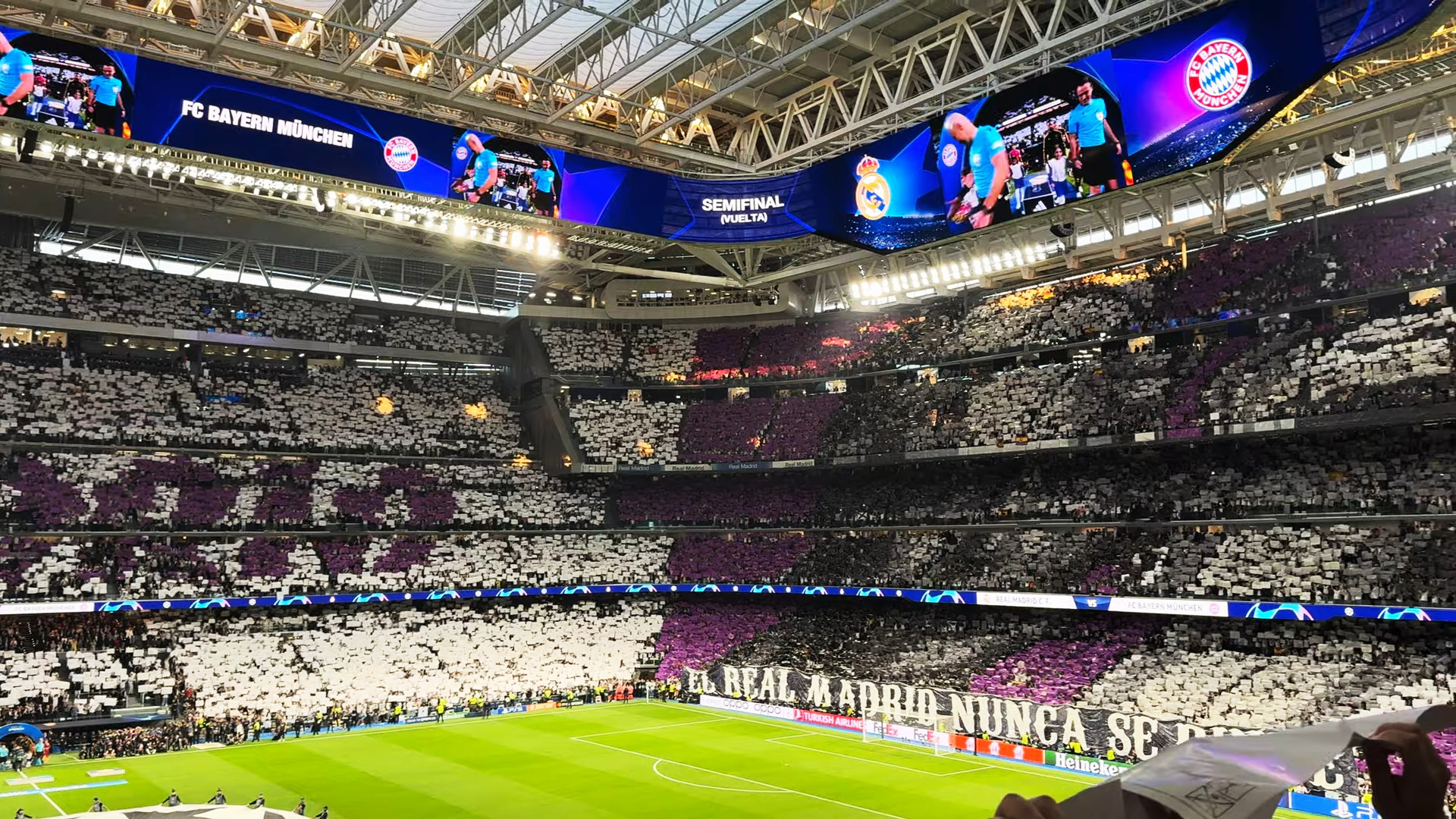
Santiago Bernabéu Stadium

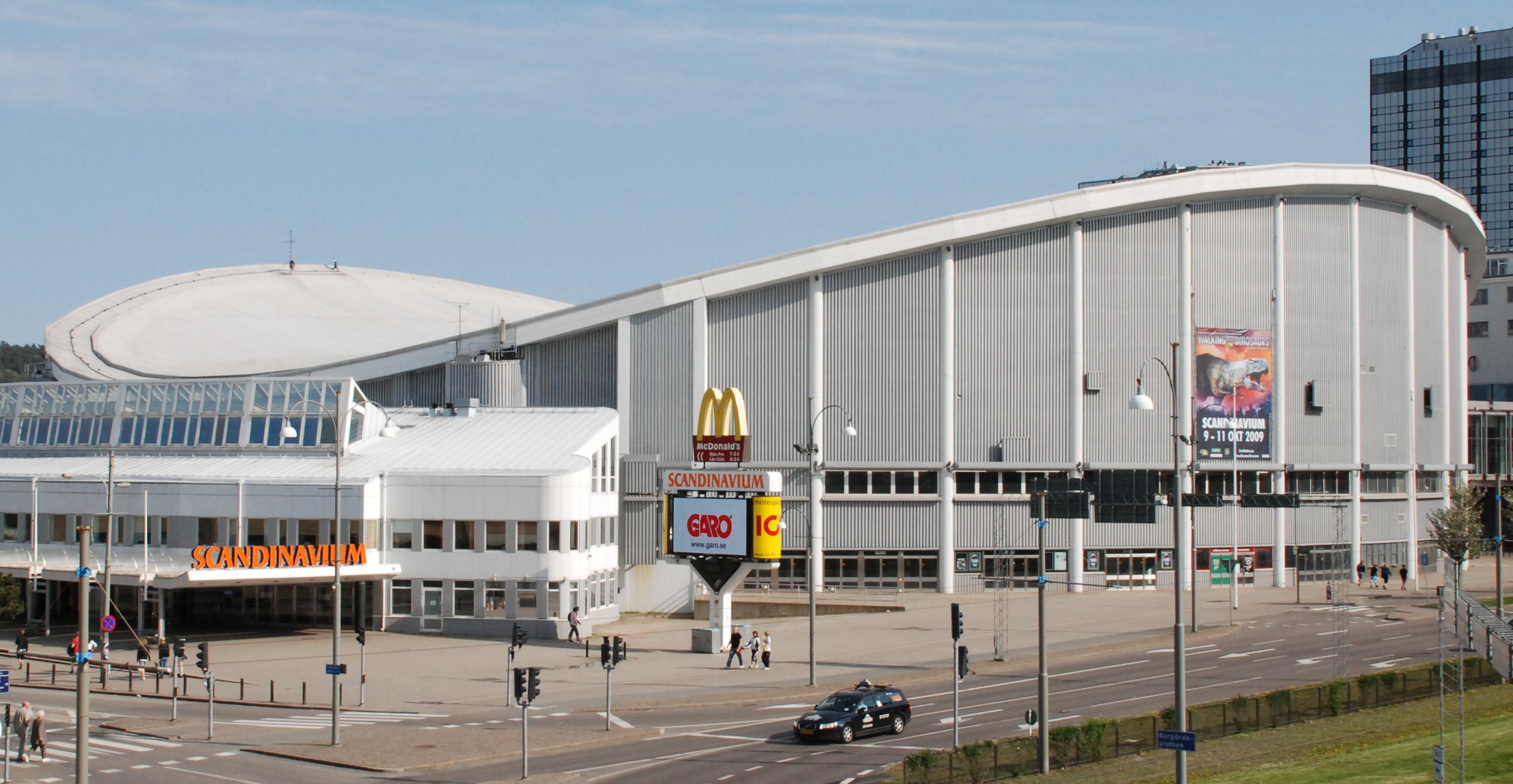
Scandinavium

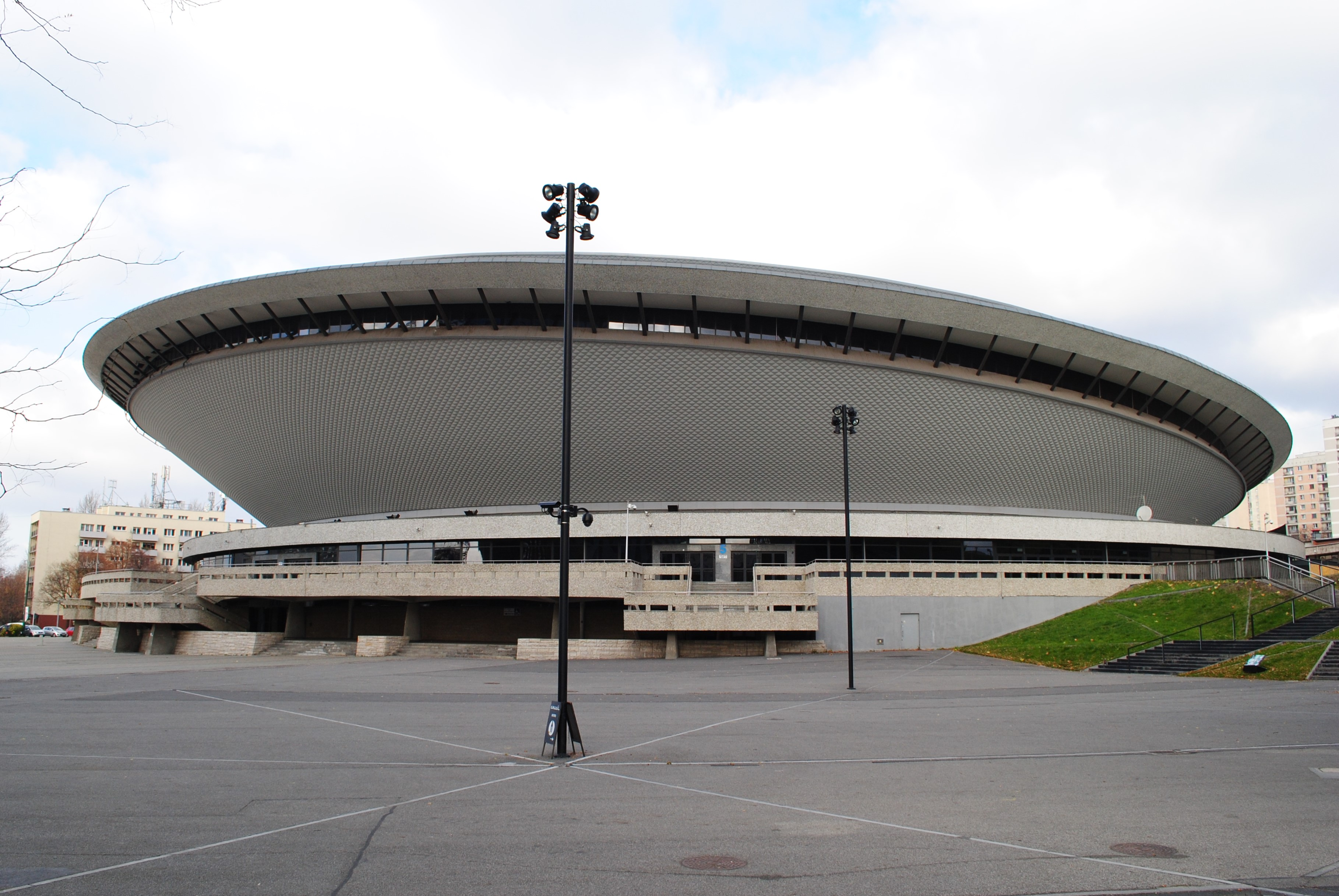
Spodek

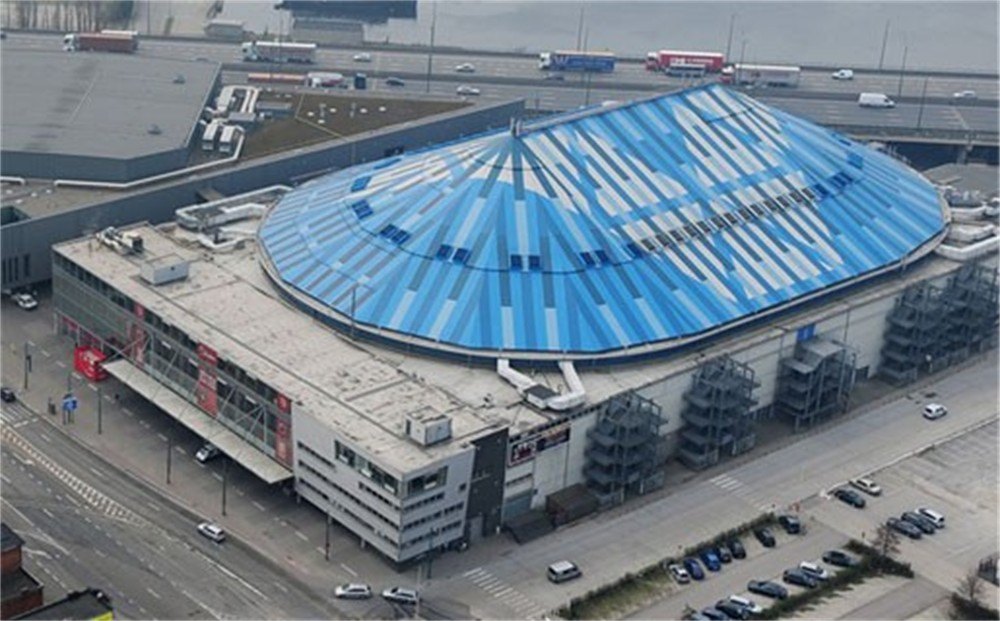
Sportpaleis

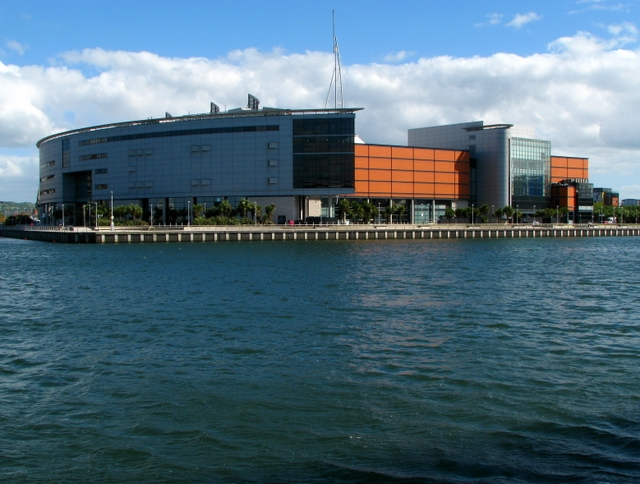
SSE Arena

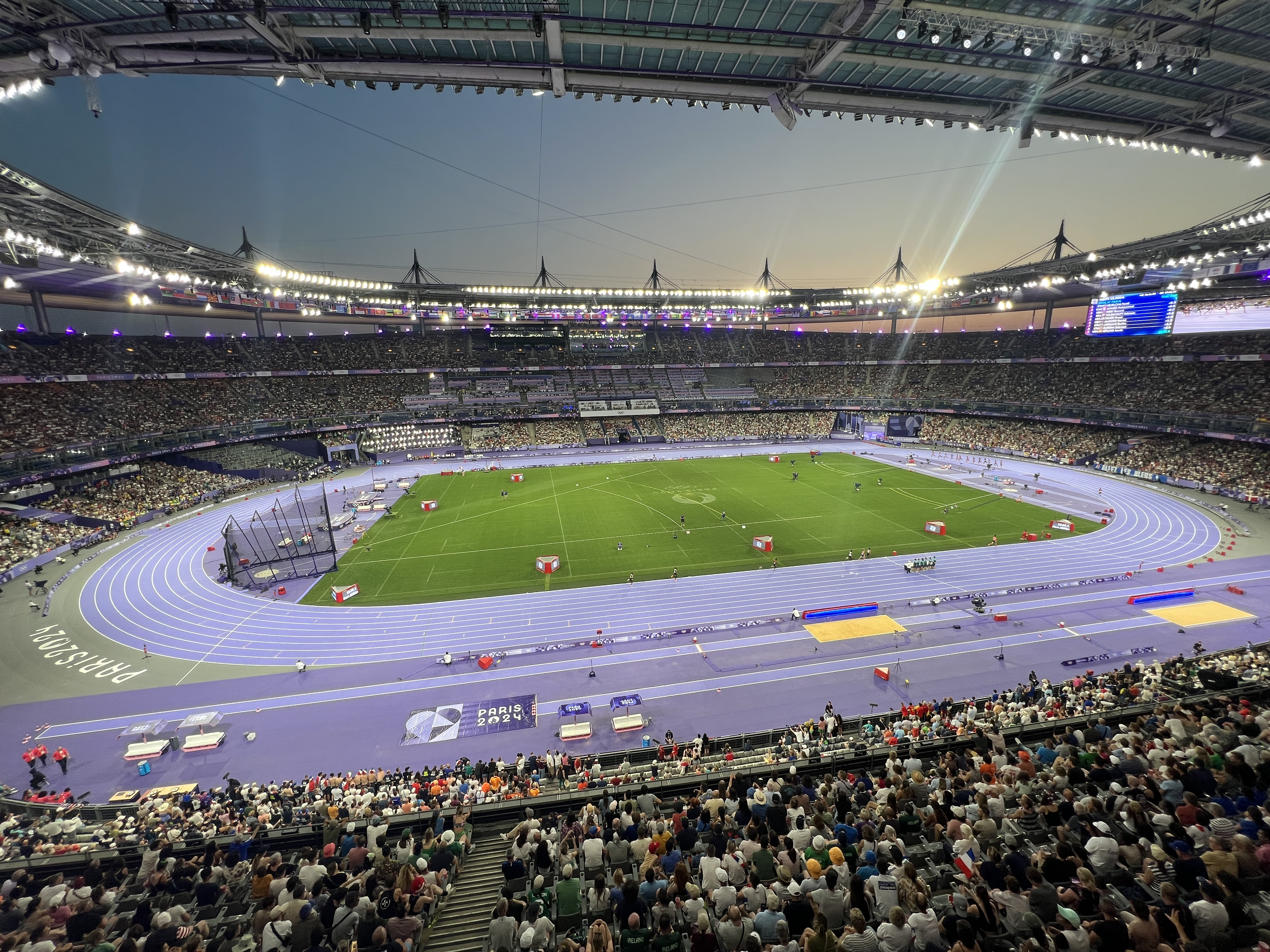
Stade de France

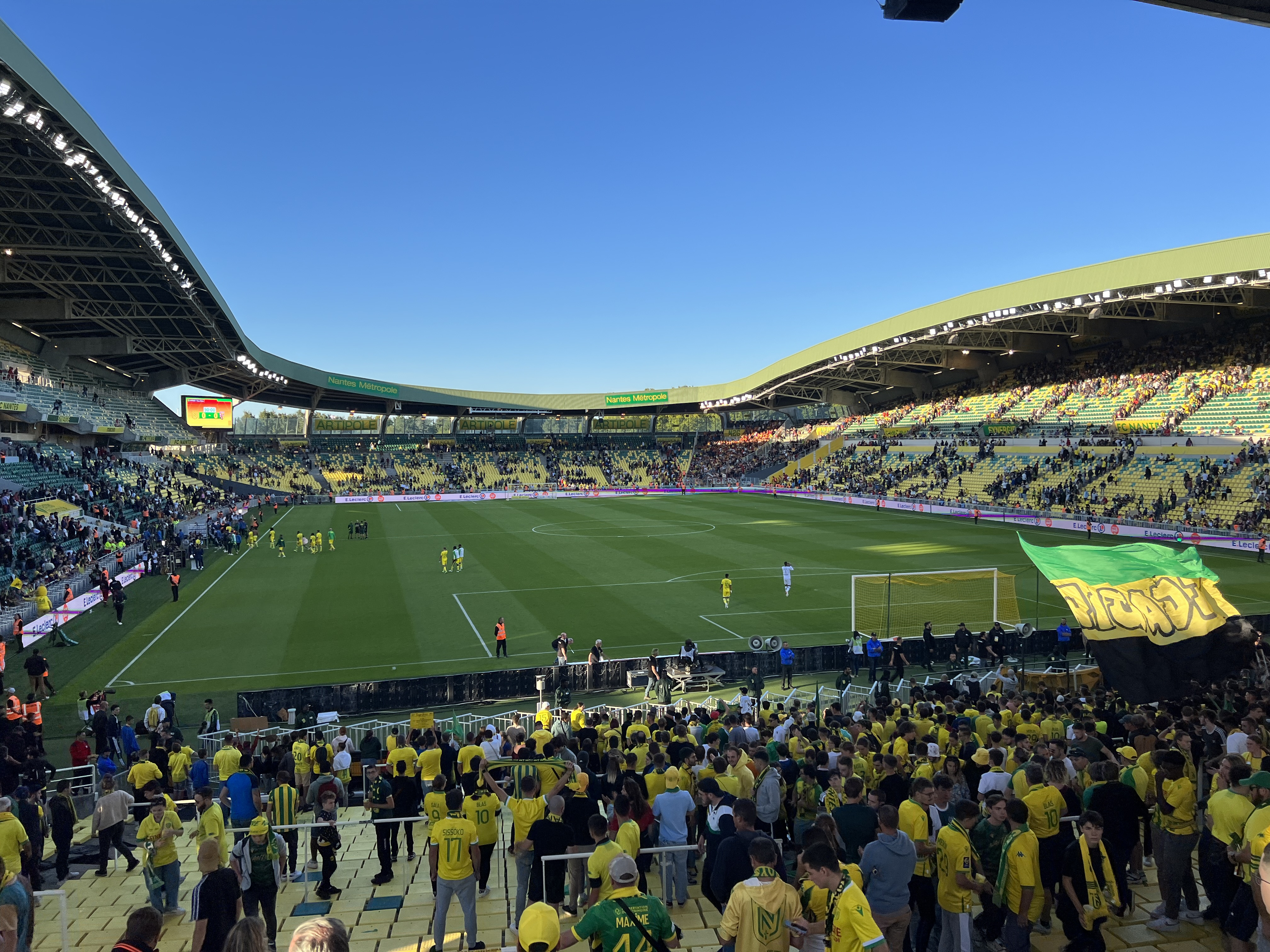
Stade de la Beaujoire

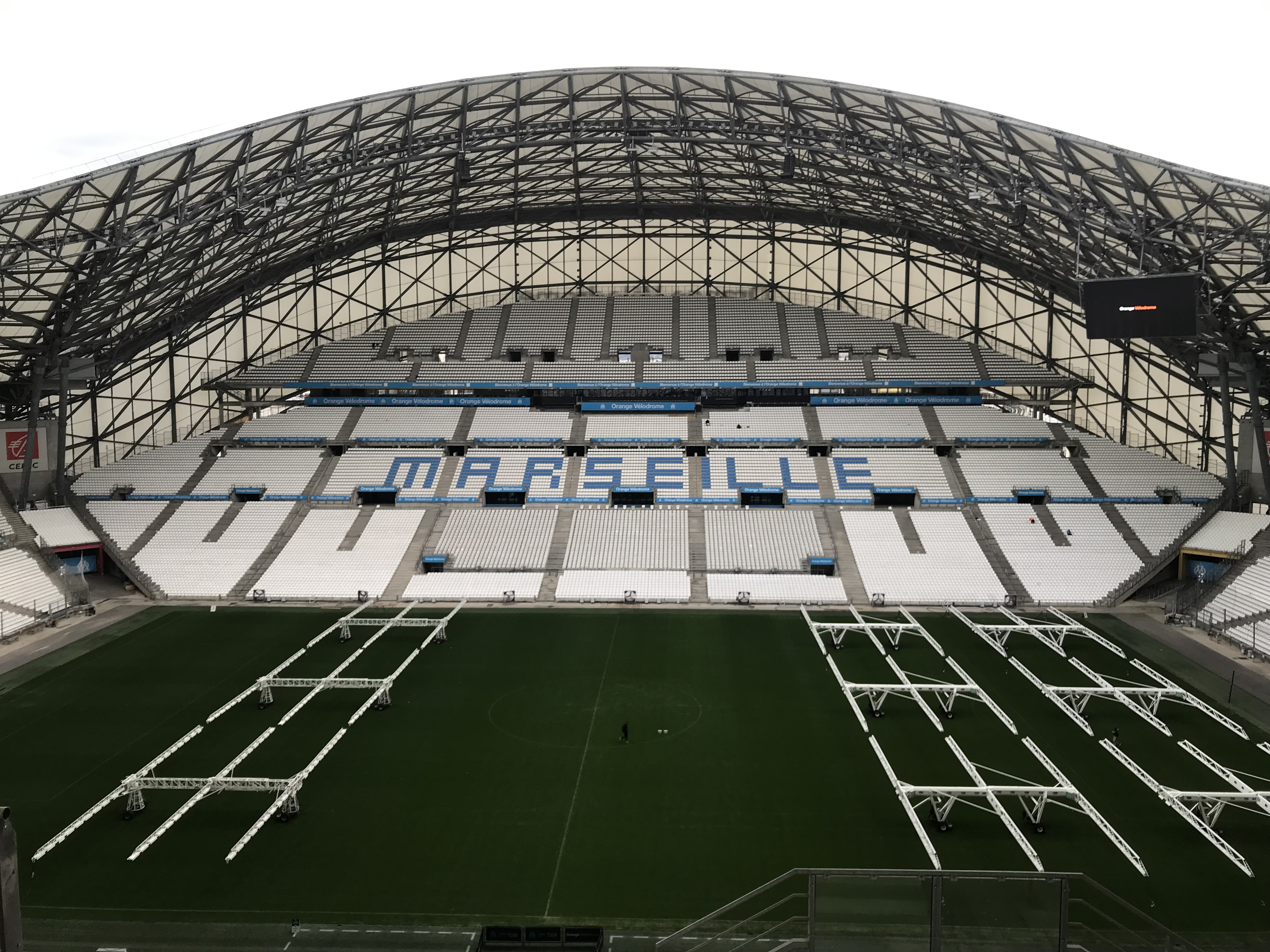
Stade Vélodrome

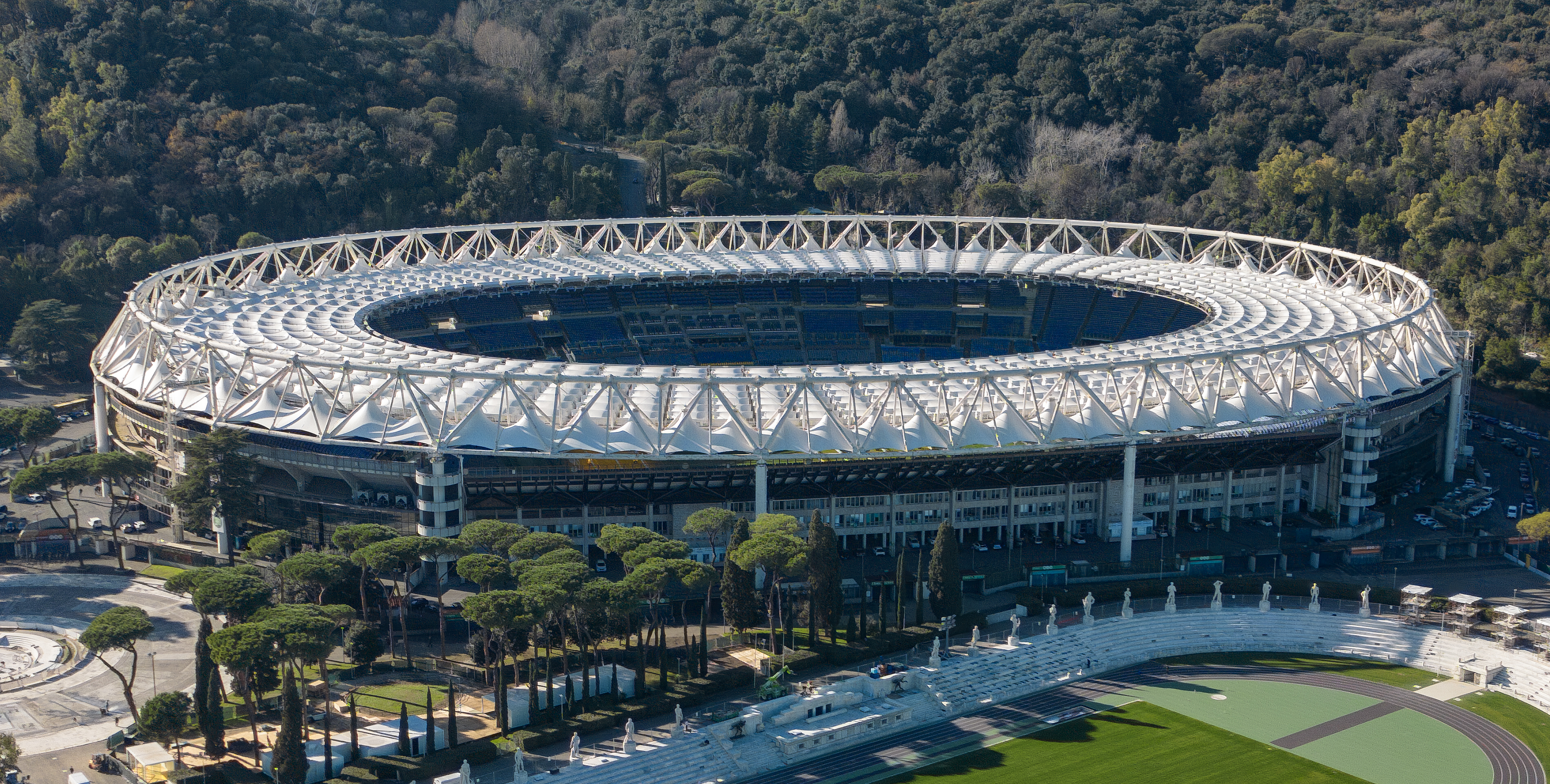
Stadio Olimpico

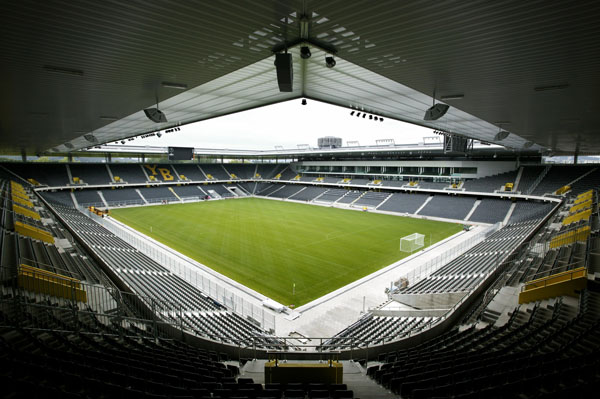
Stadion Wankdorf

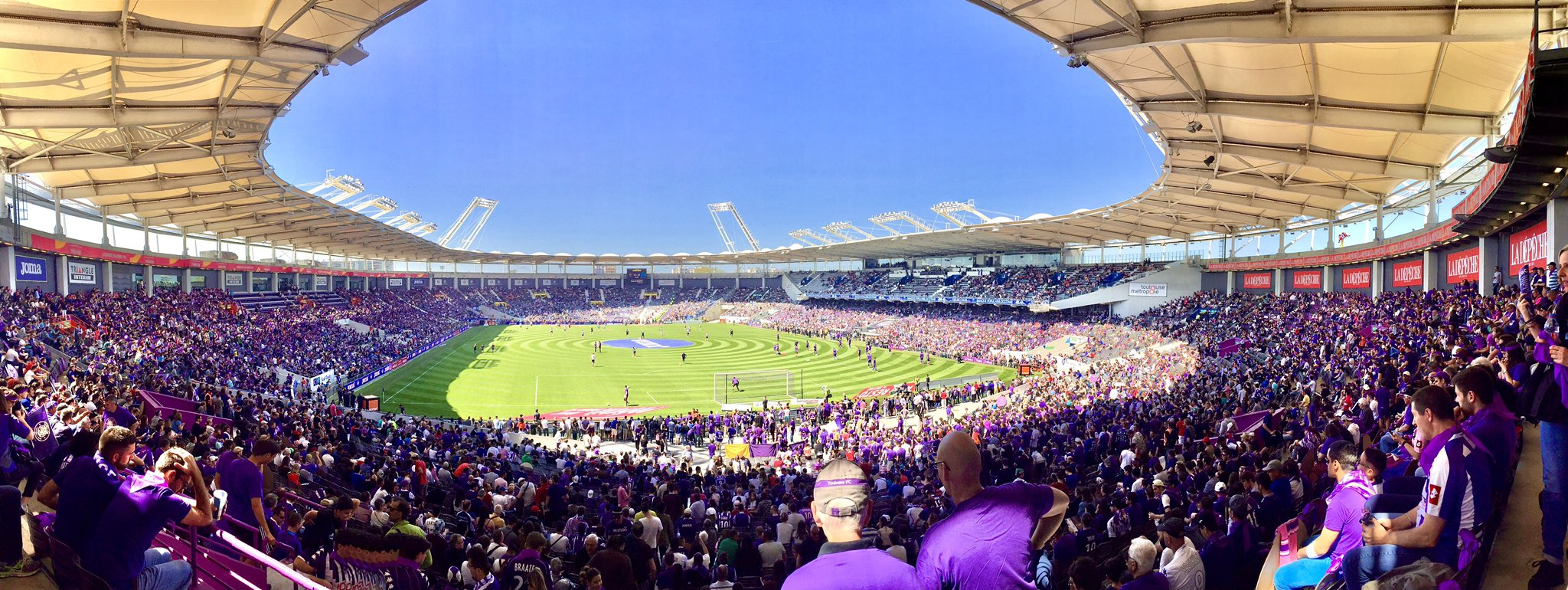
Stadium de Toulouse

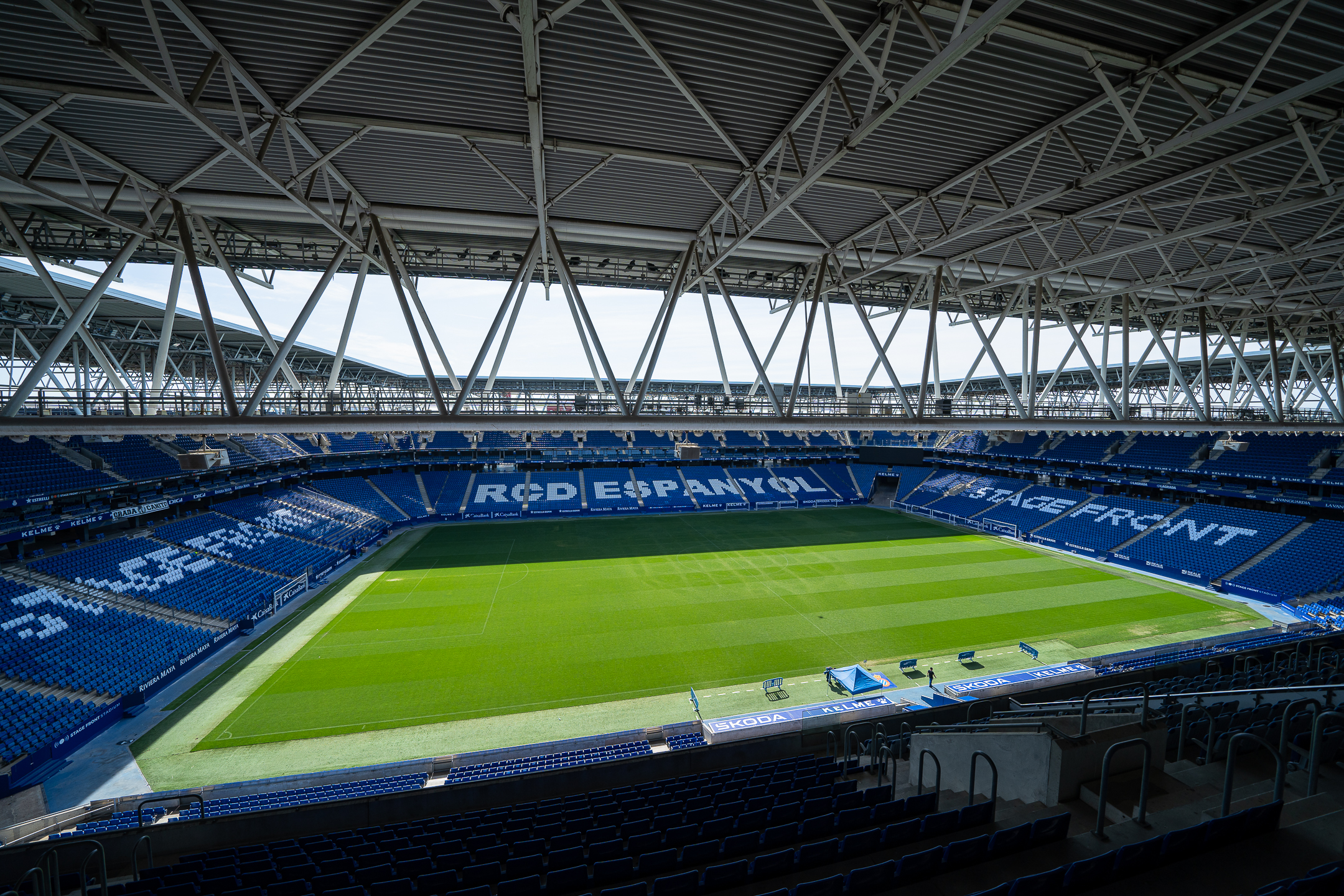
Stage Front Stadium

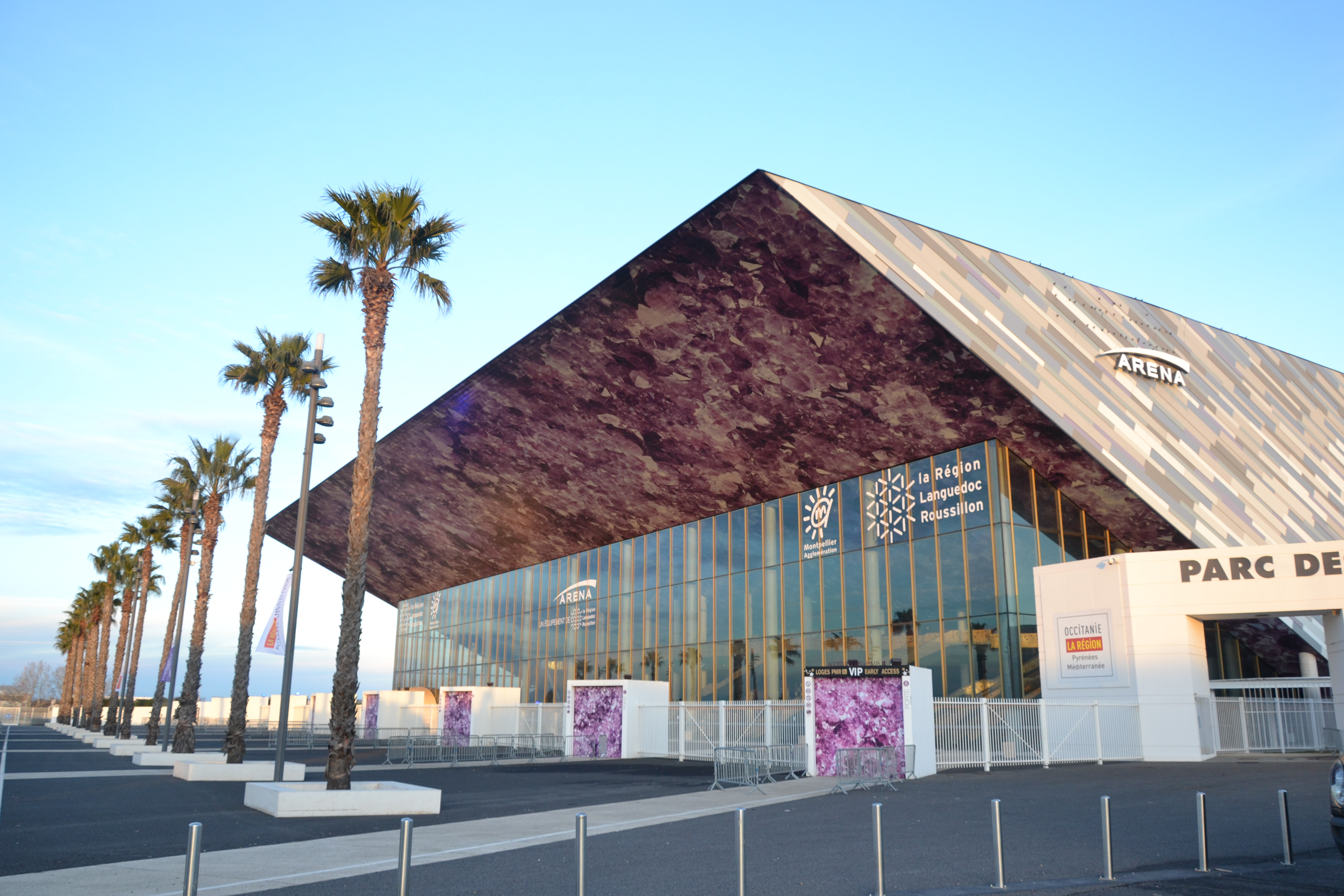
Sud de France Arena

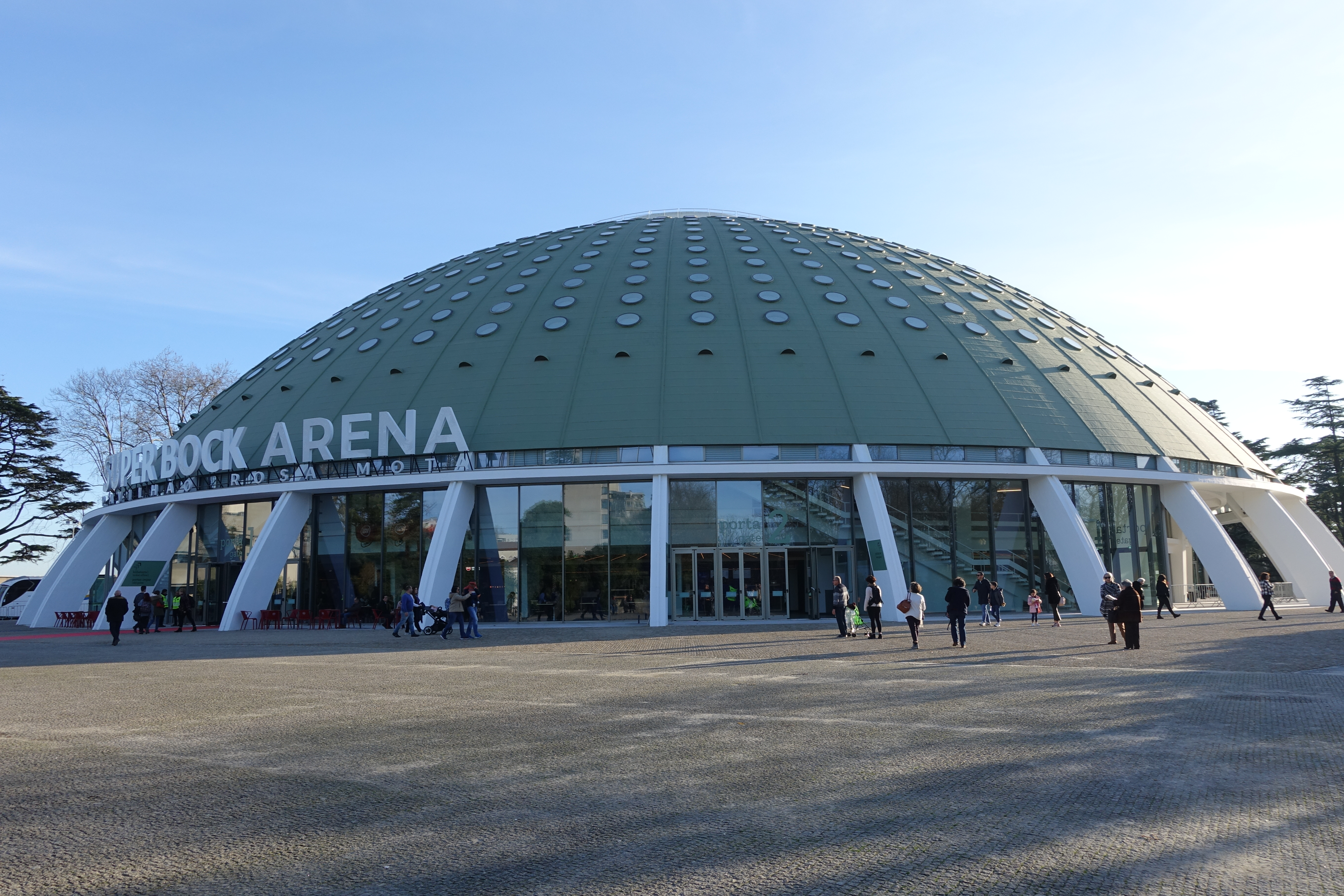
Super Bock Arena

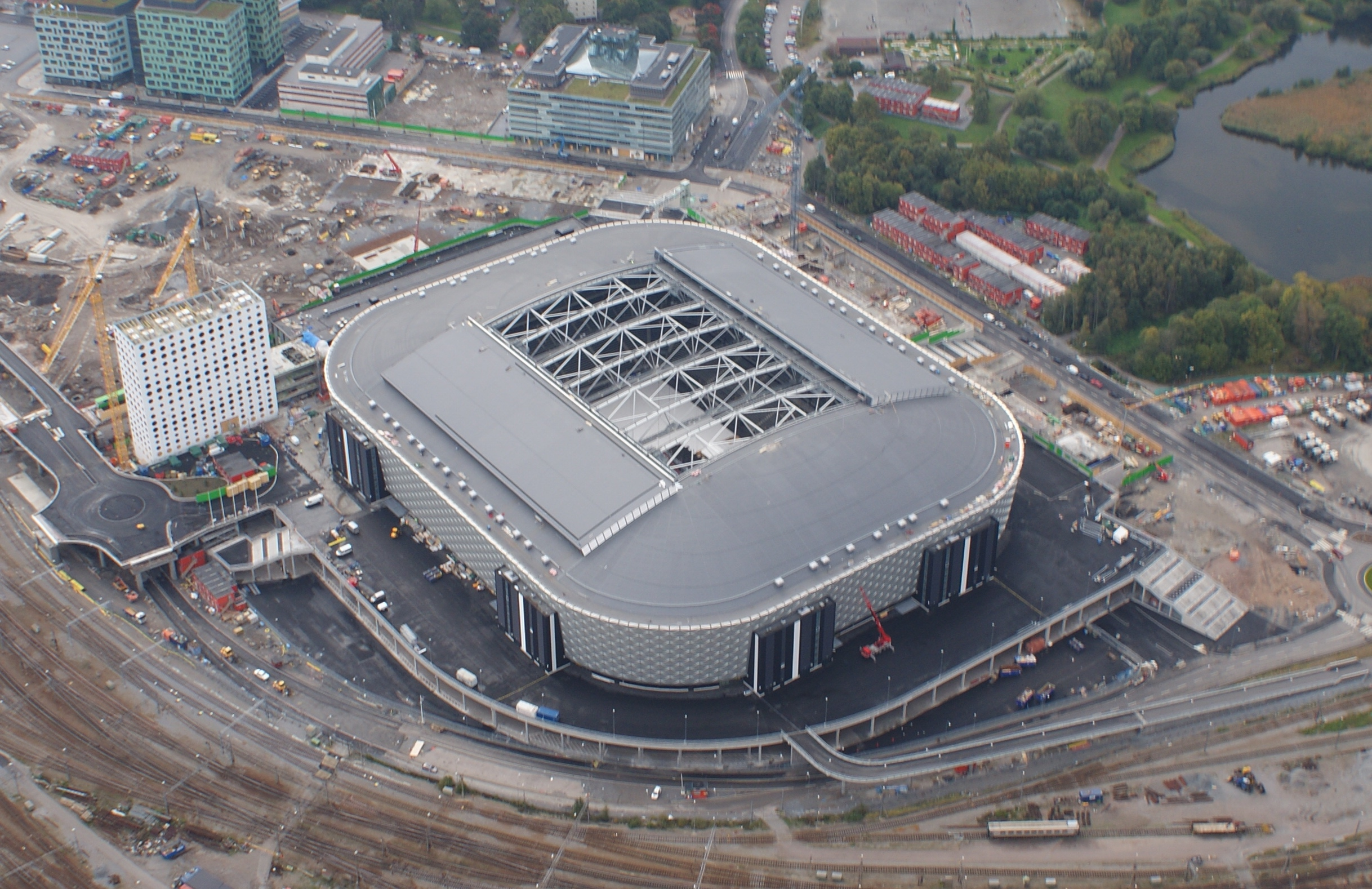
Strawberry Arena

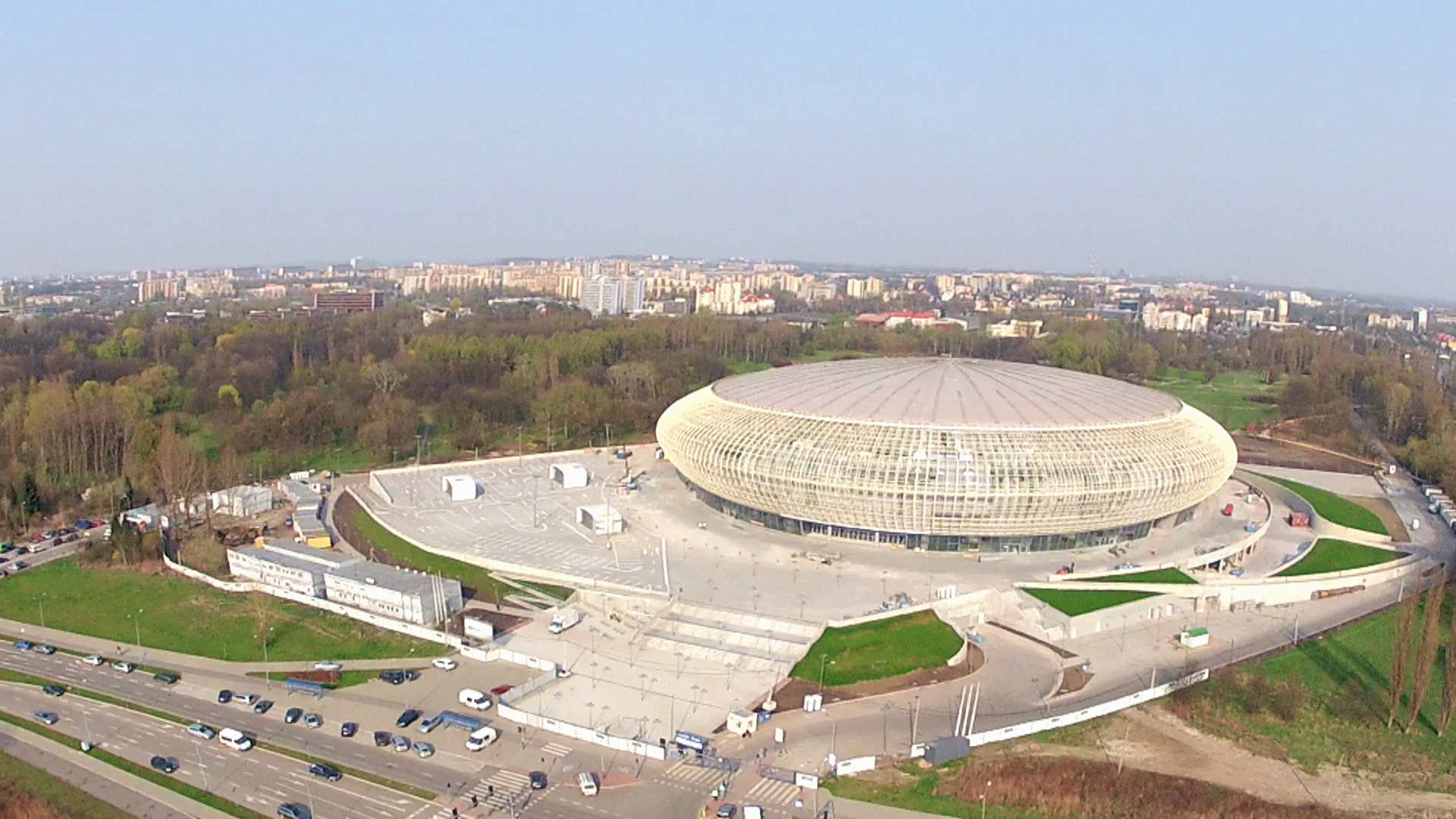
Tauron Arena Kraków

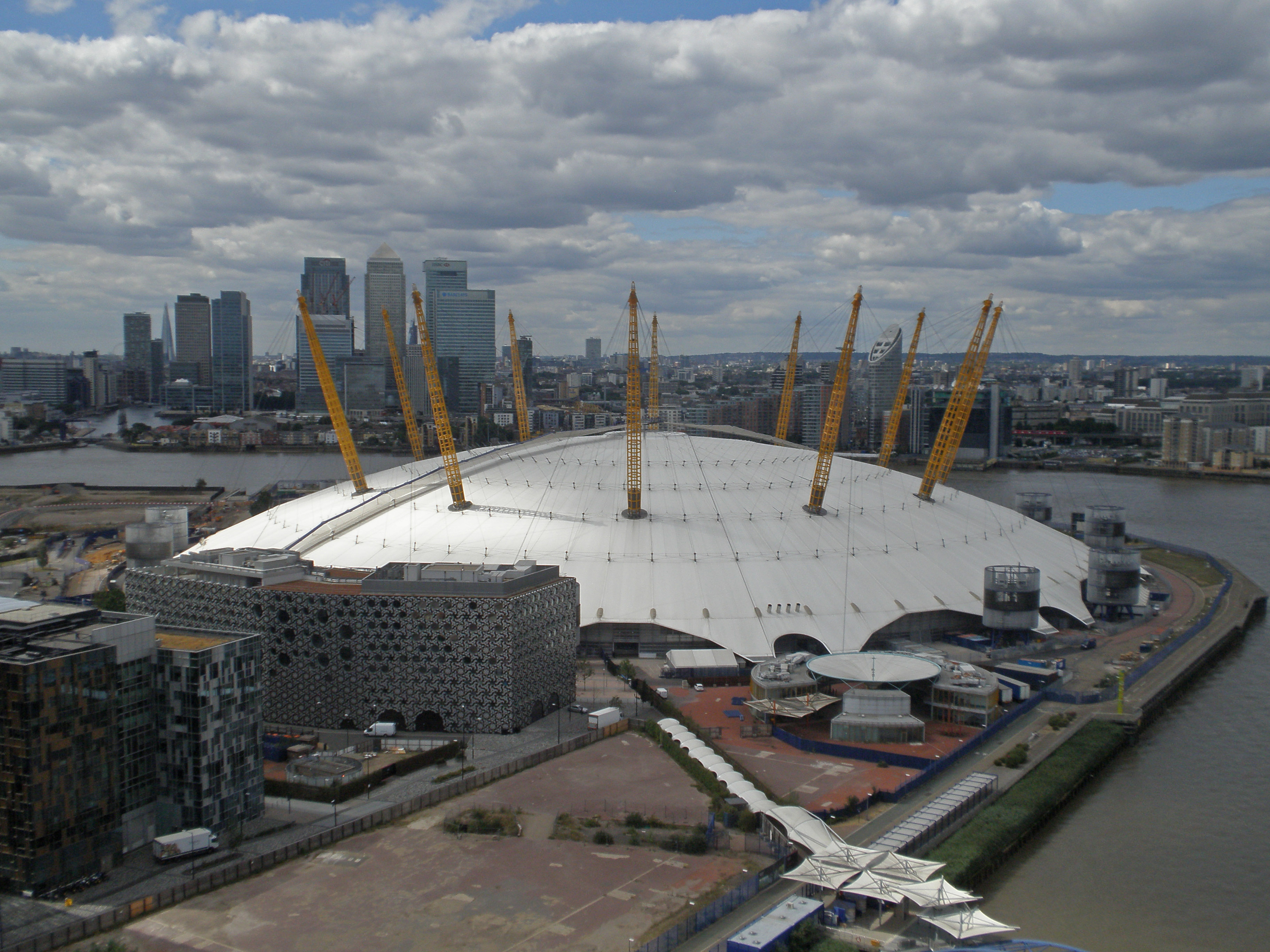
The O2 Arena

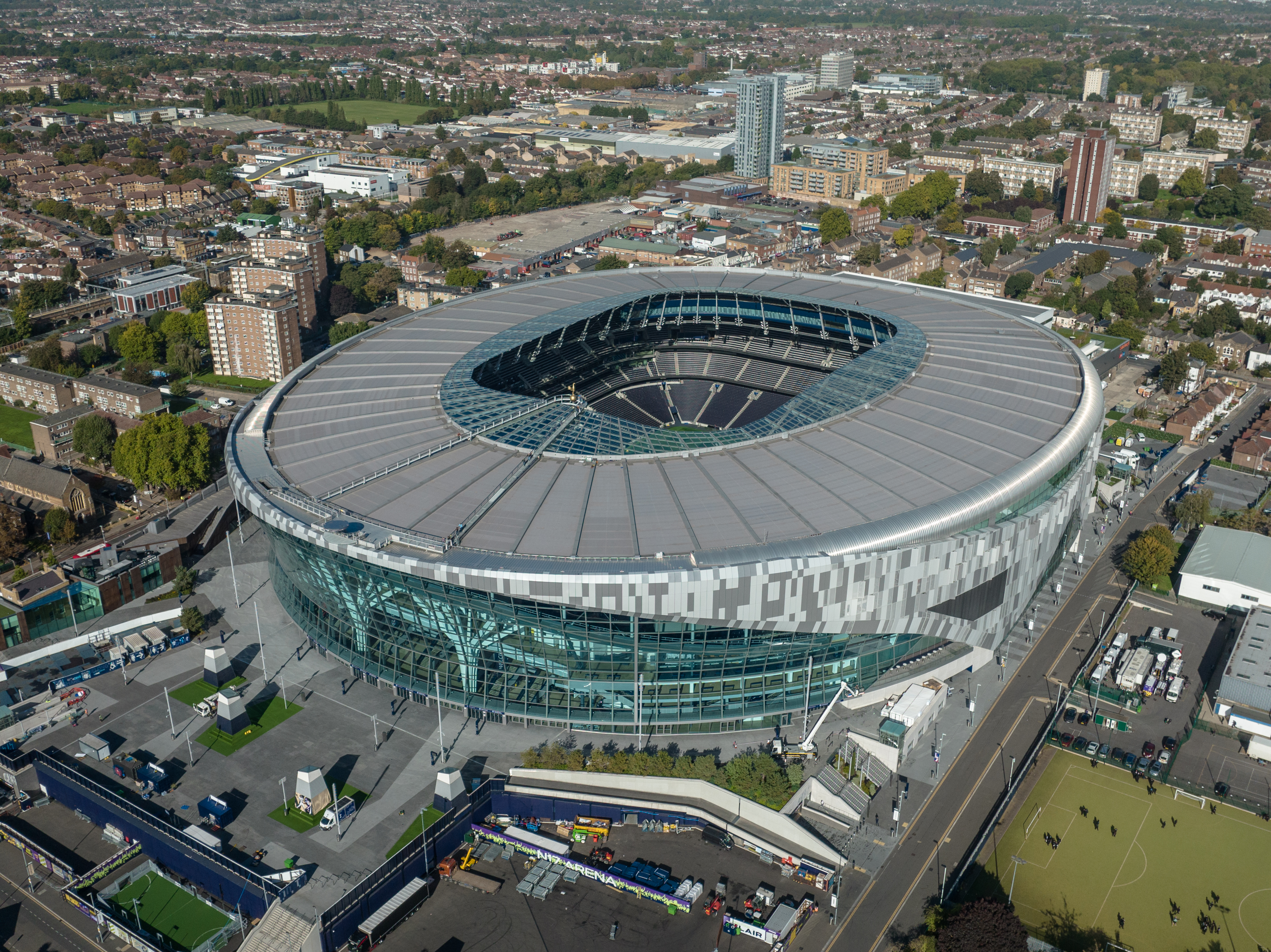
Tottenham Hotspur Stadium

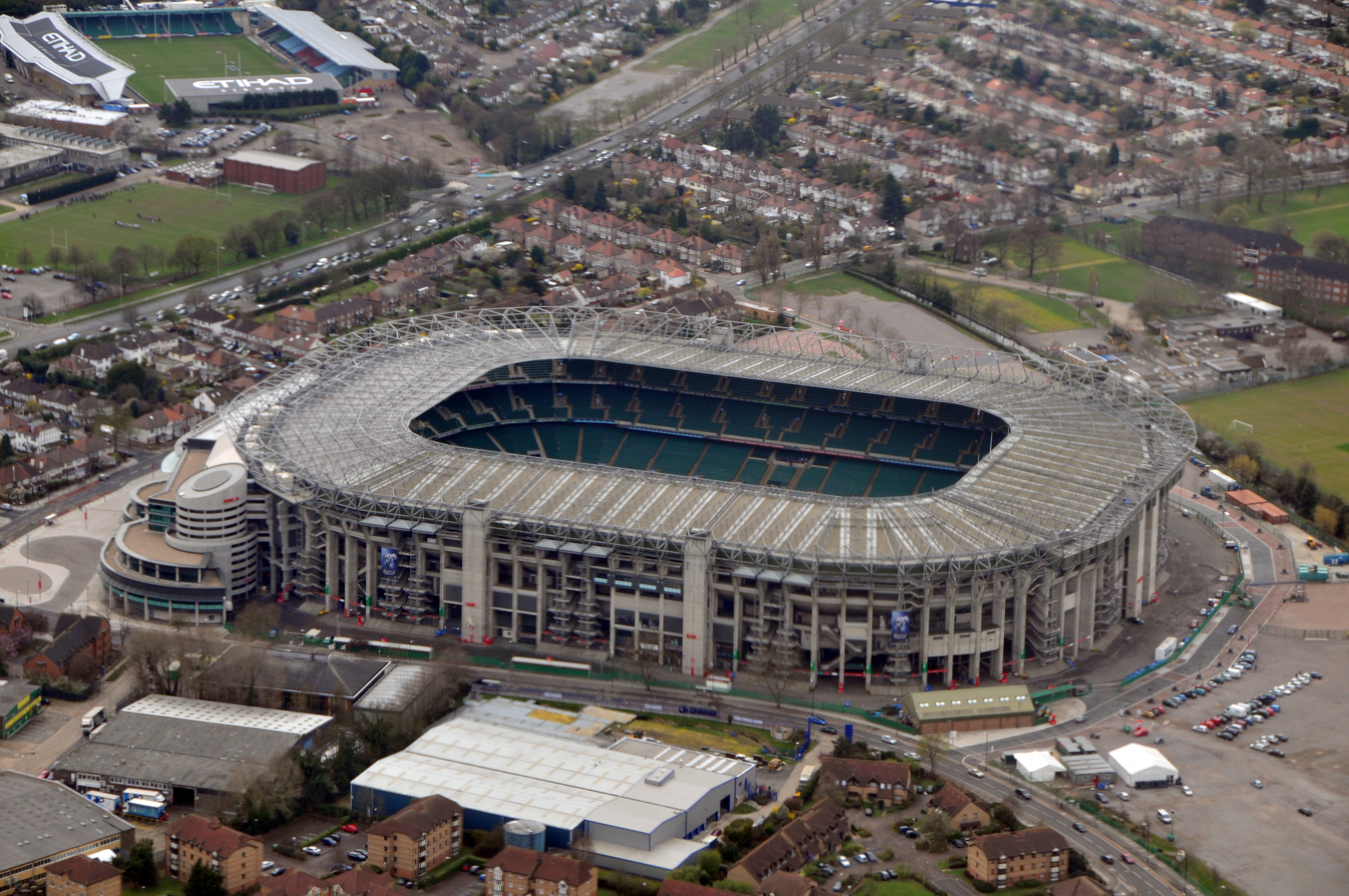
Twickenham Stadium

Twinsbet Arena

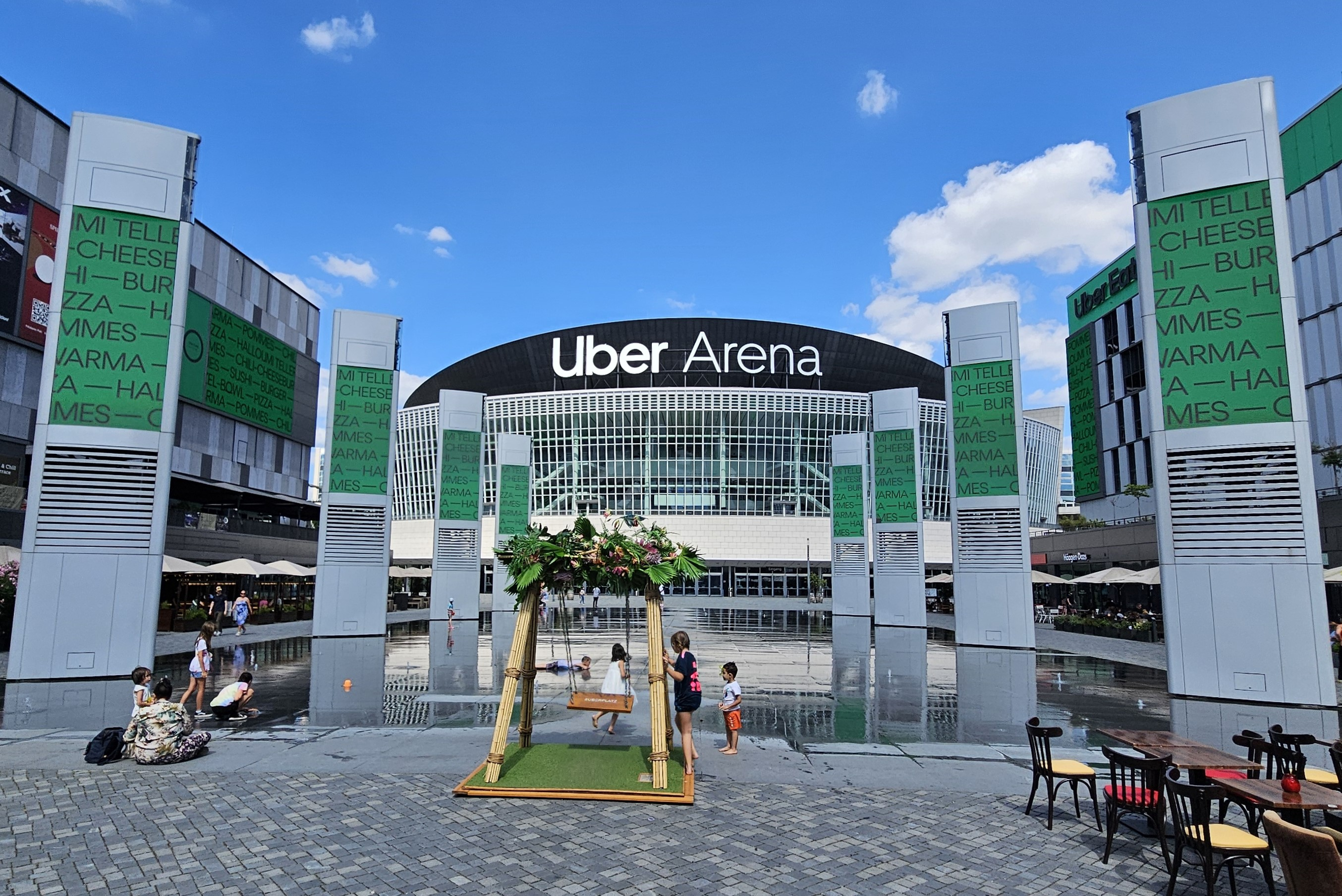
Uber Arena

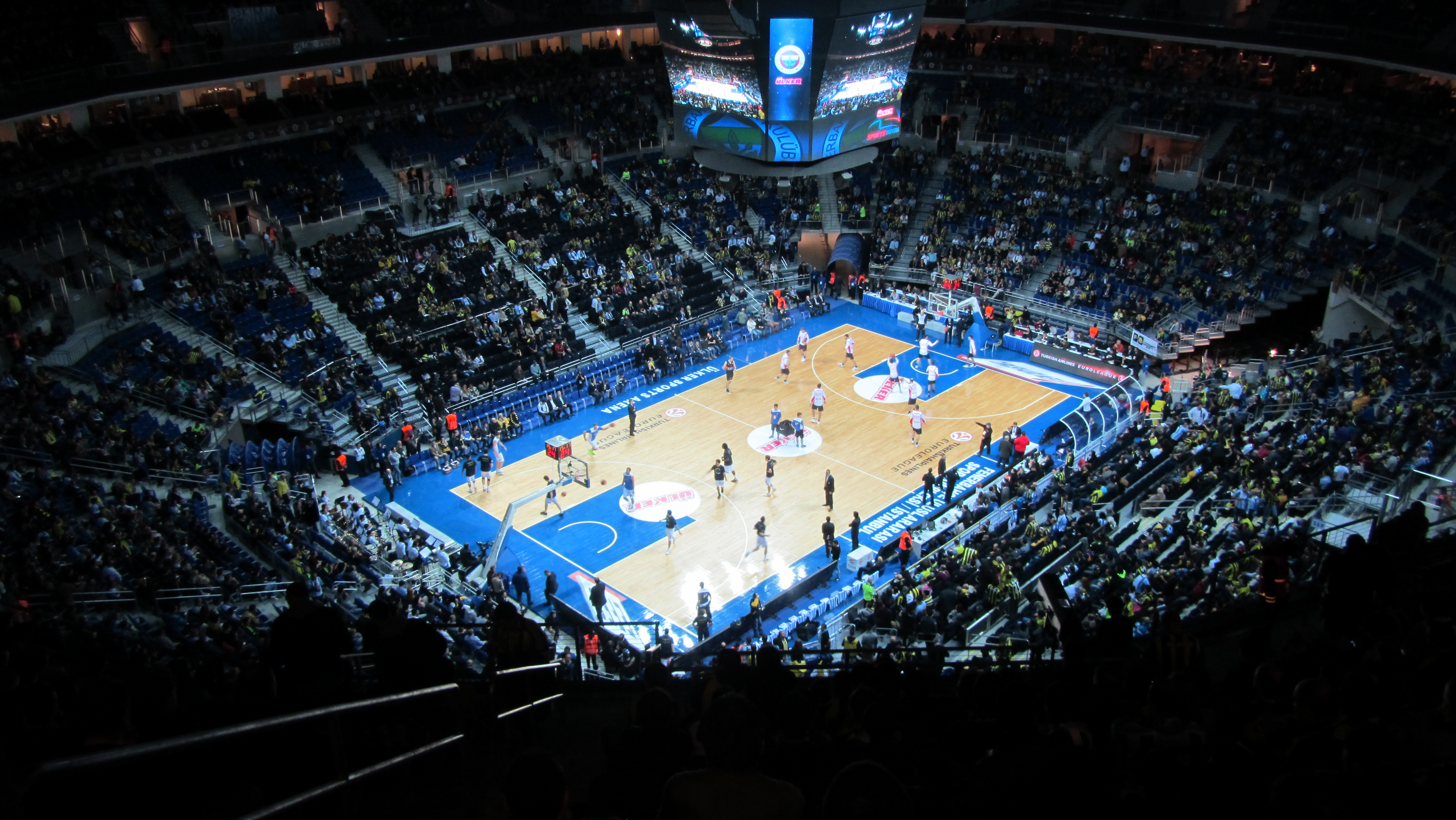
Ülker Sports Arena

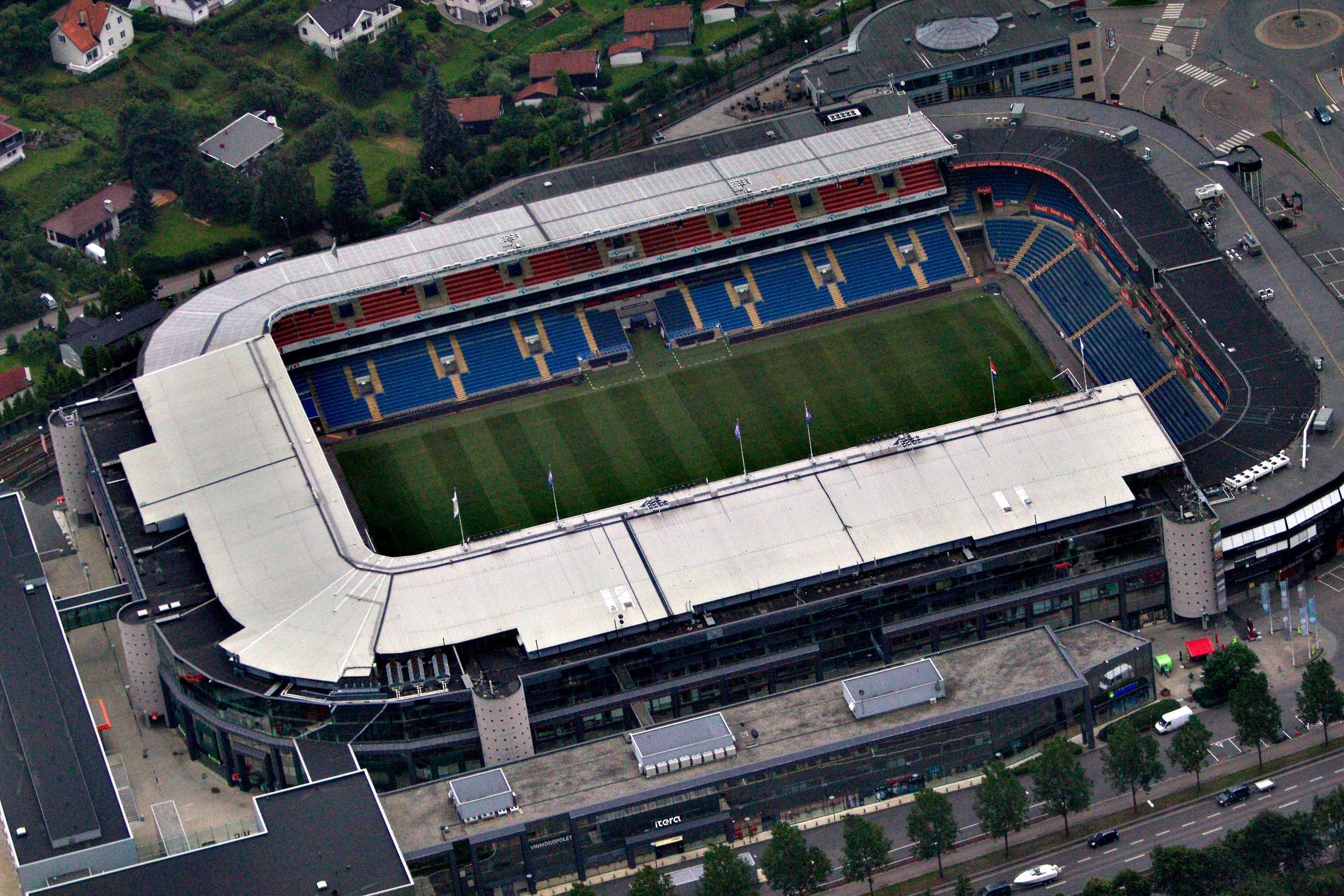
Ullevaal Stadion

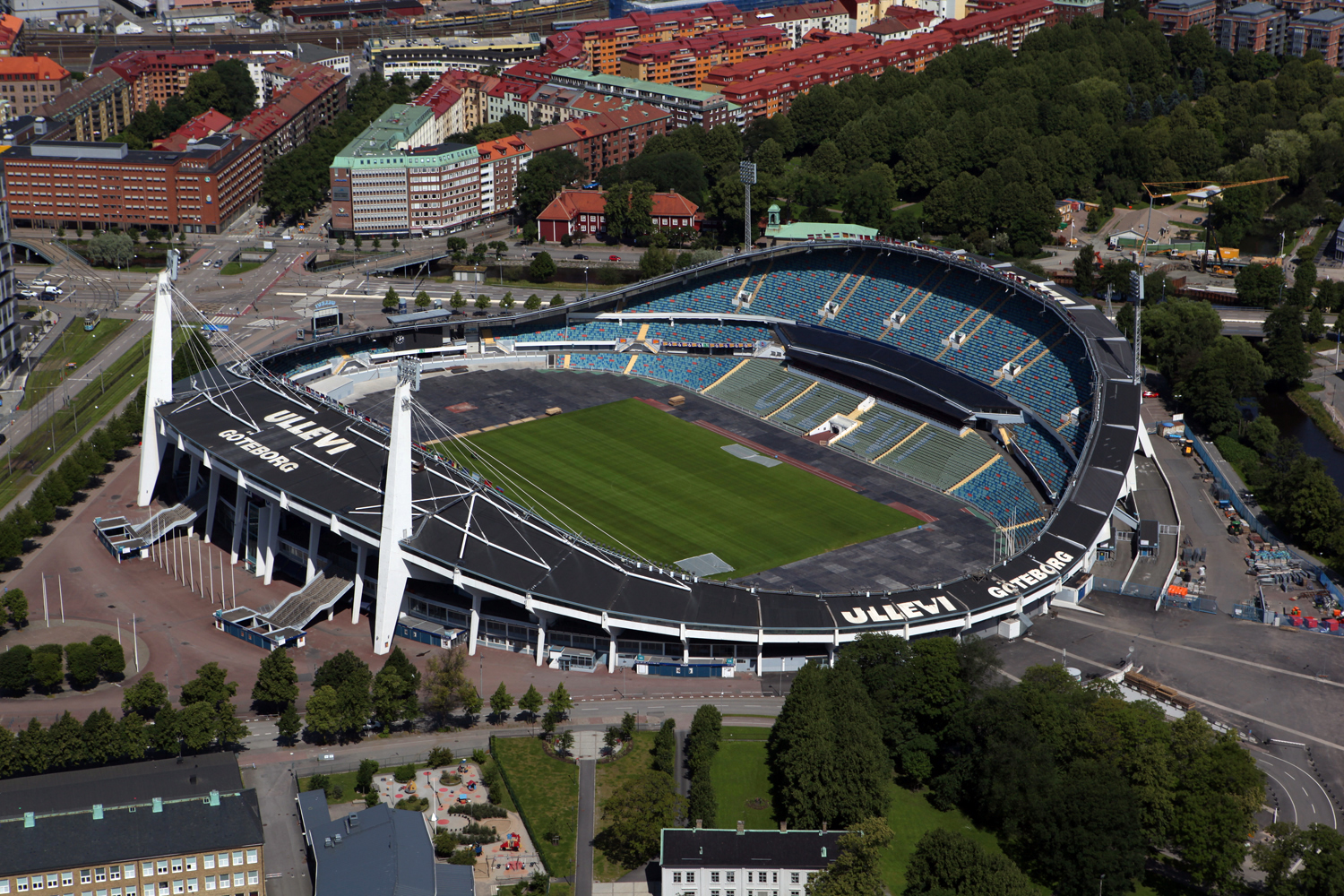
Ullevi

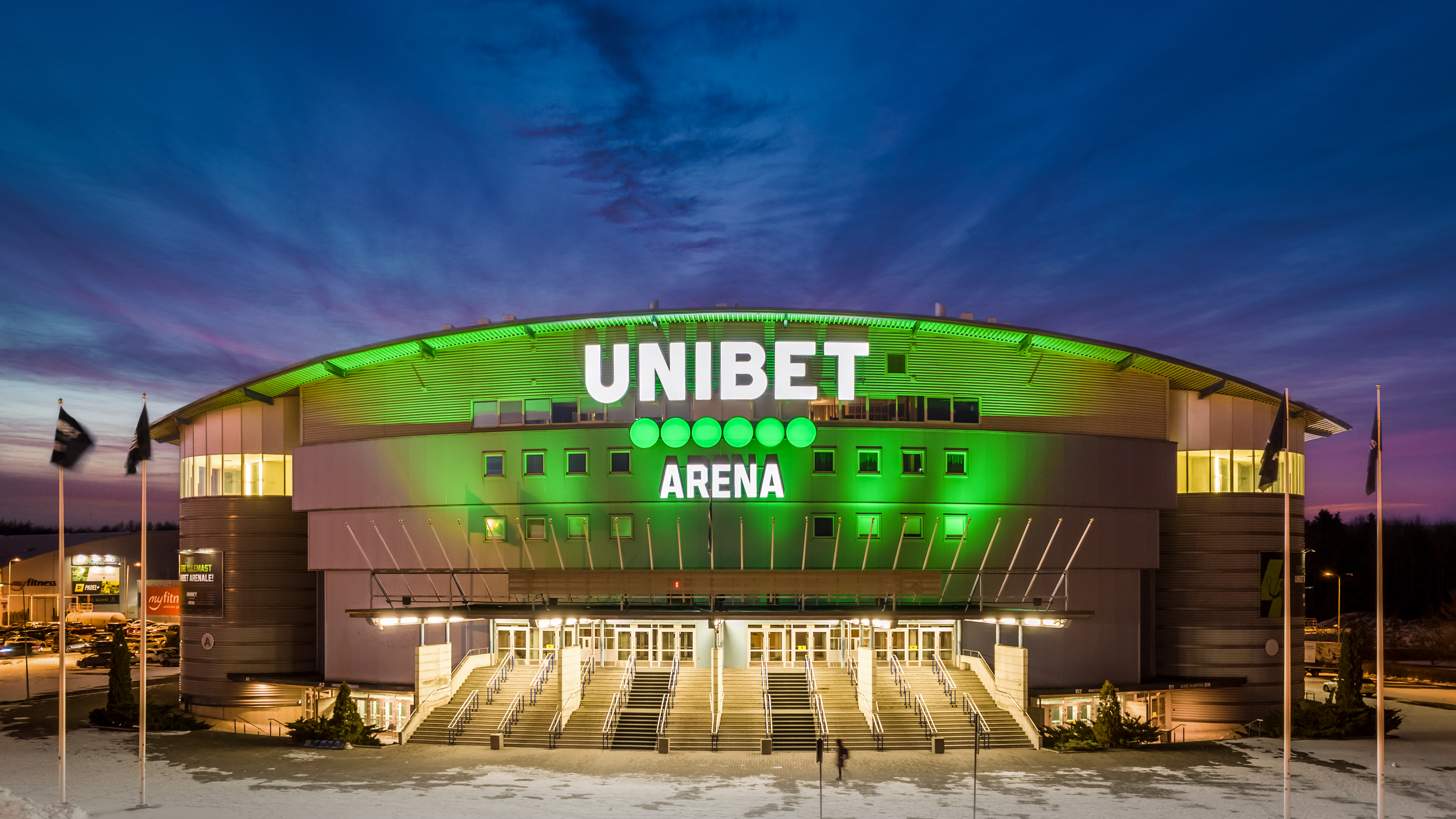
Unibet Arena

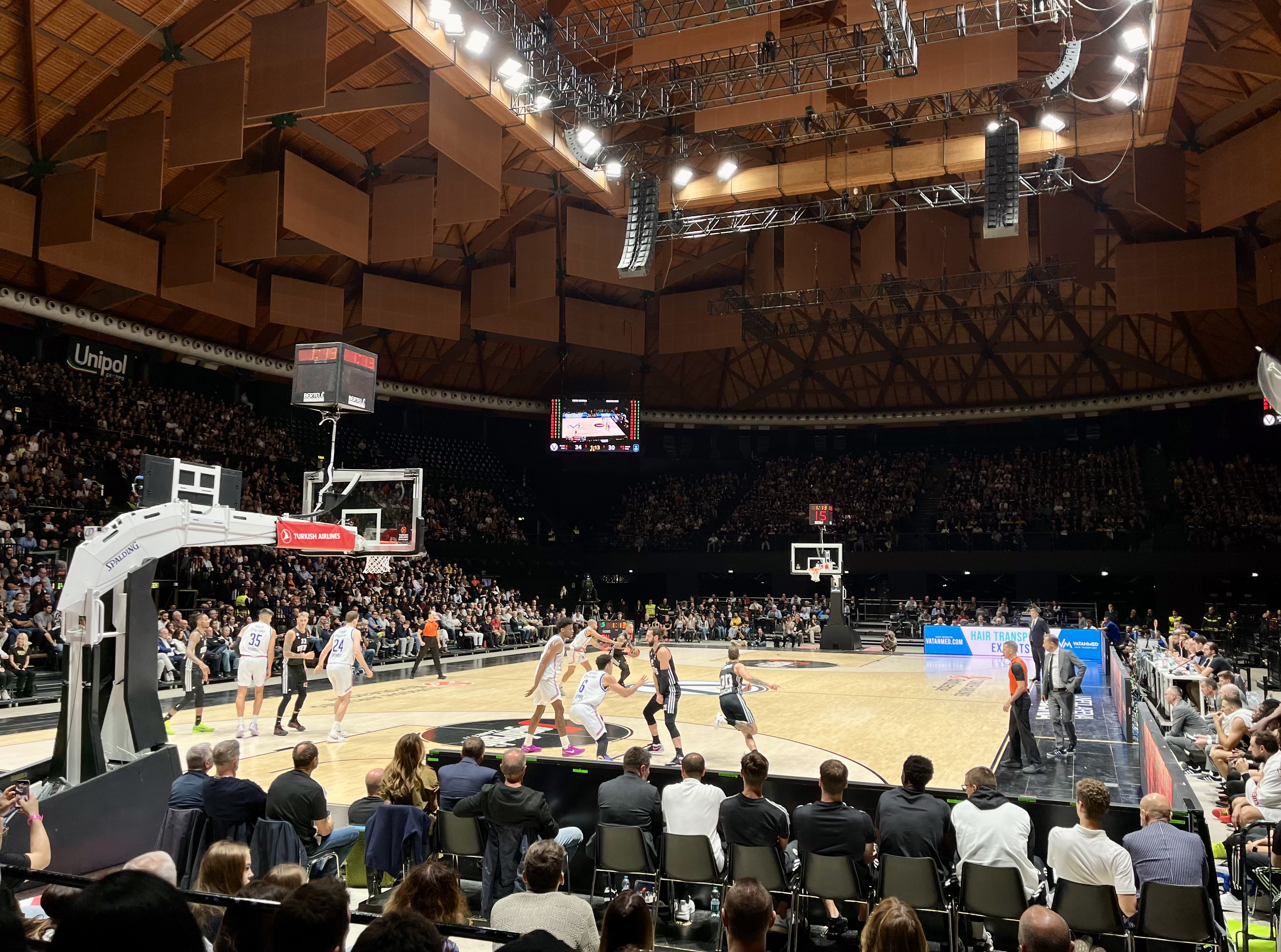
Unipol Arena

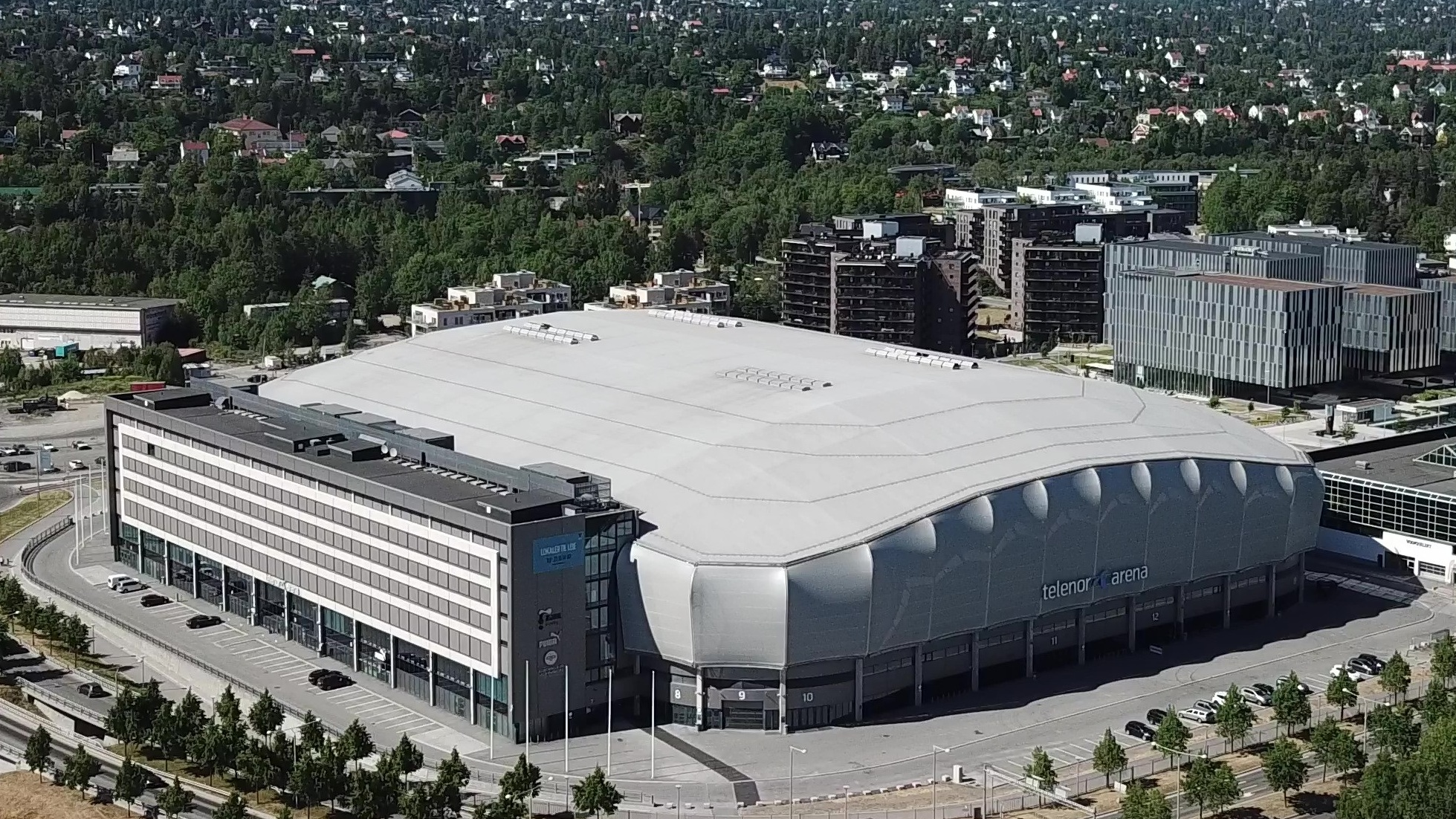
Unity Arena

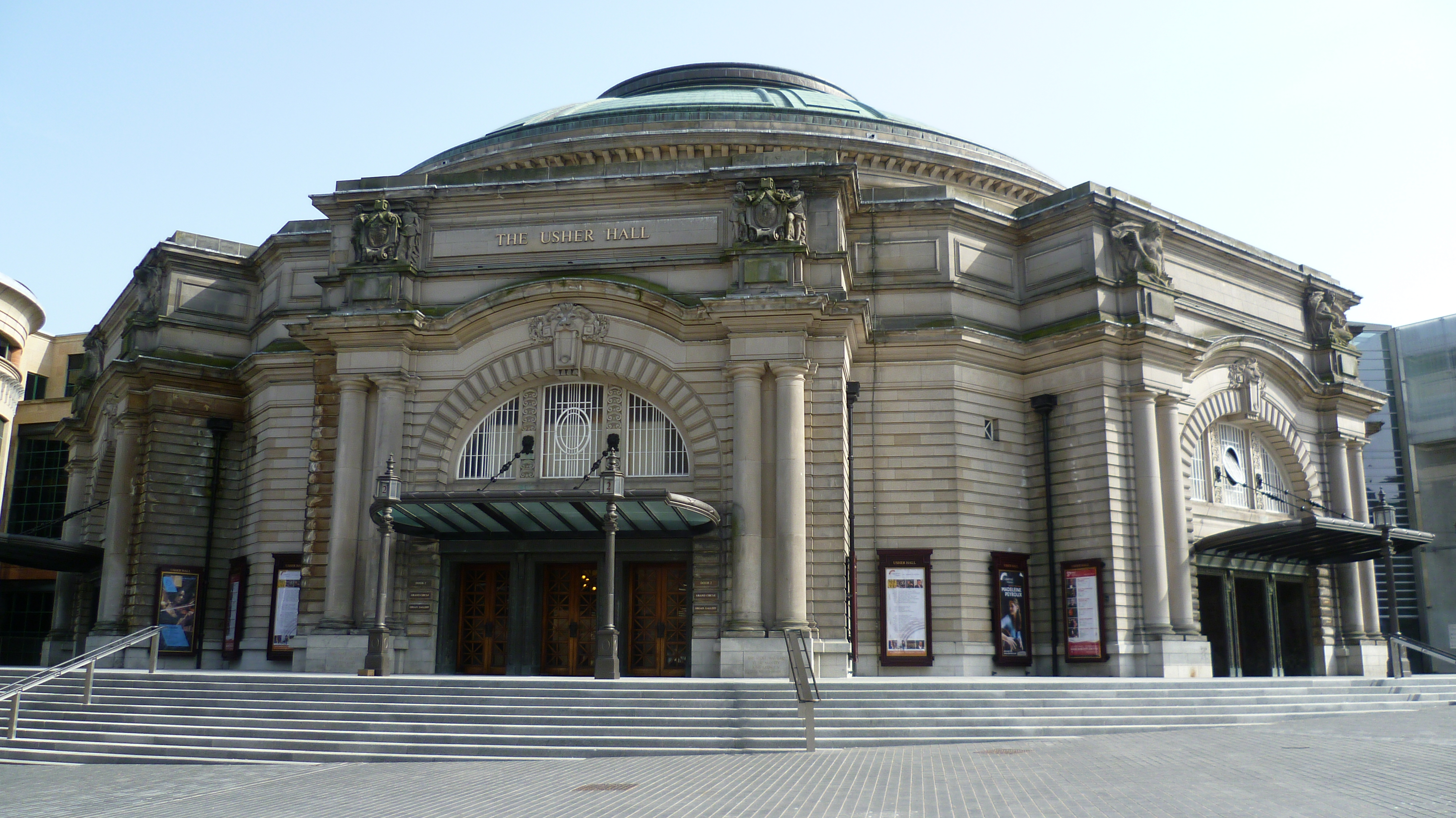
Usher Hall

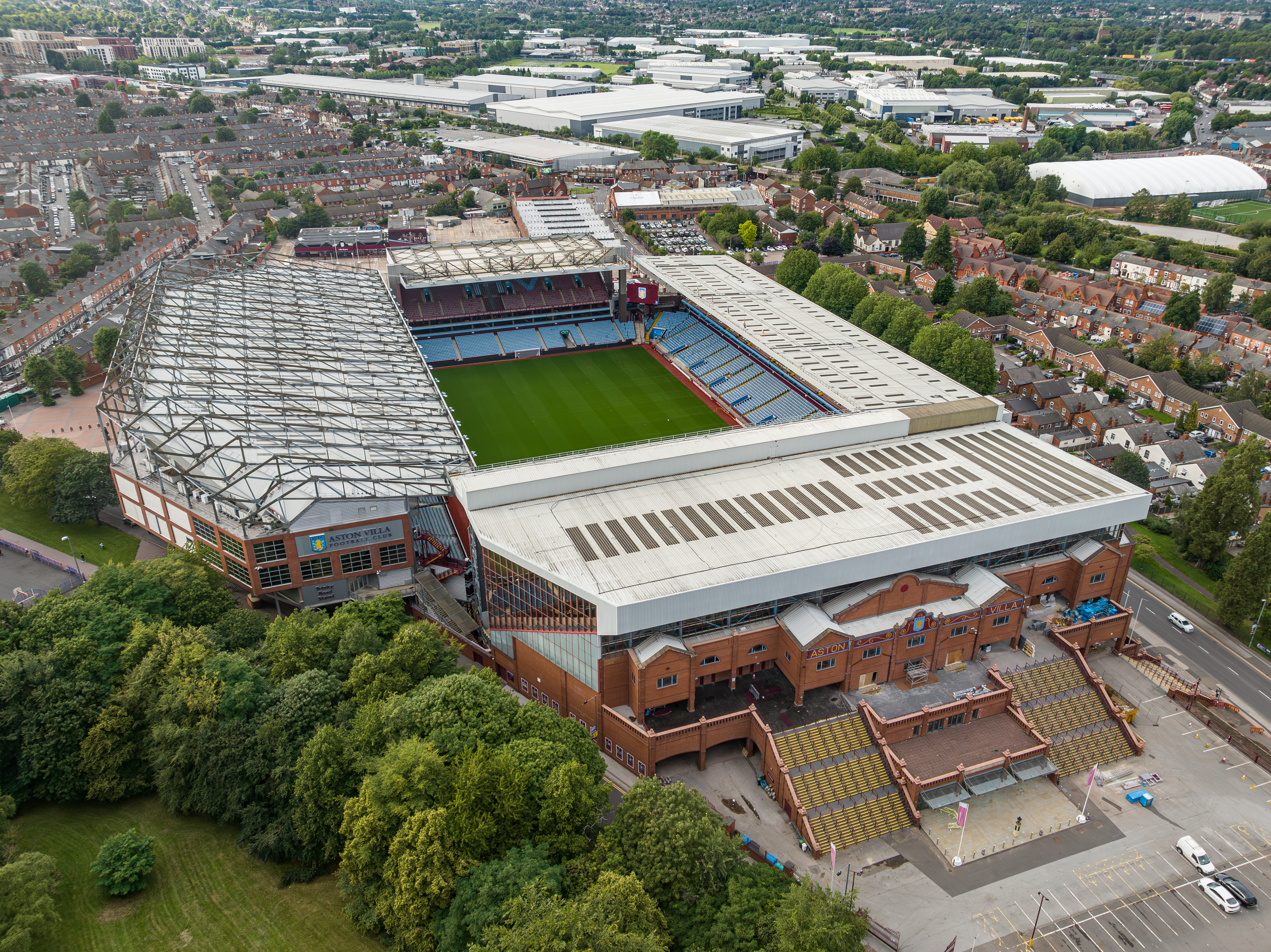
Villa Park

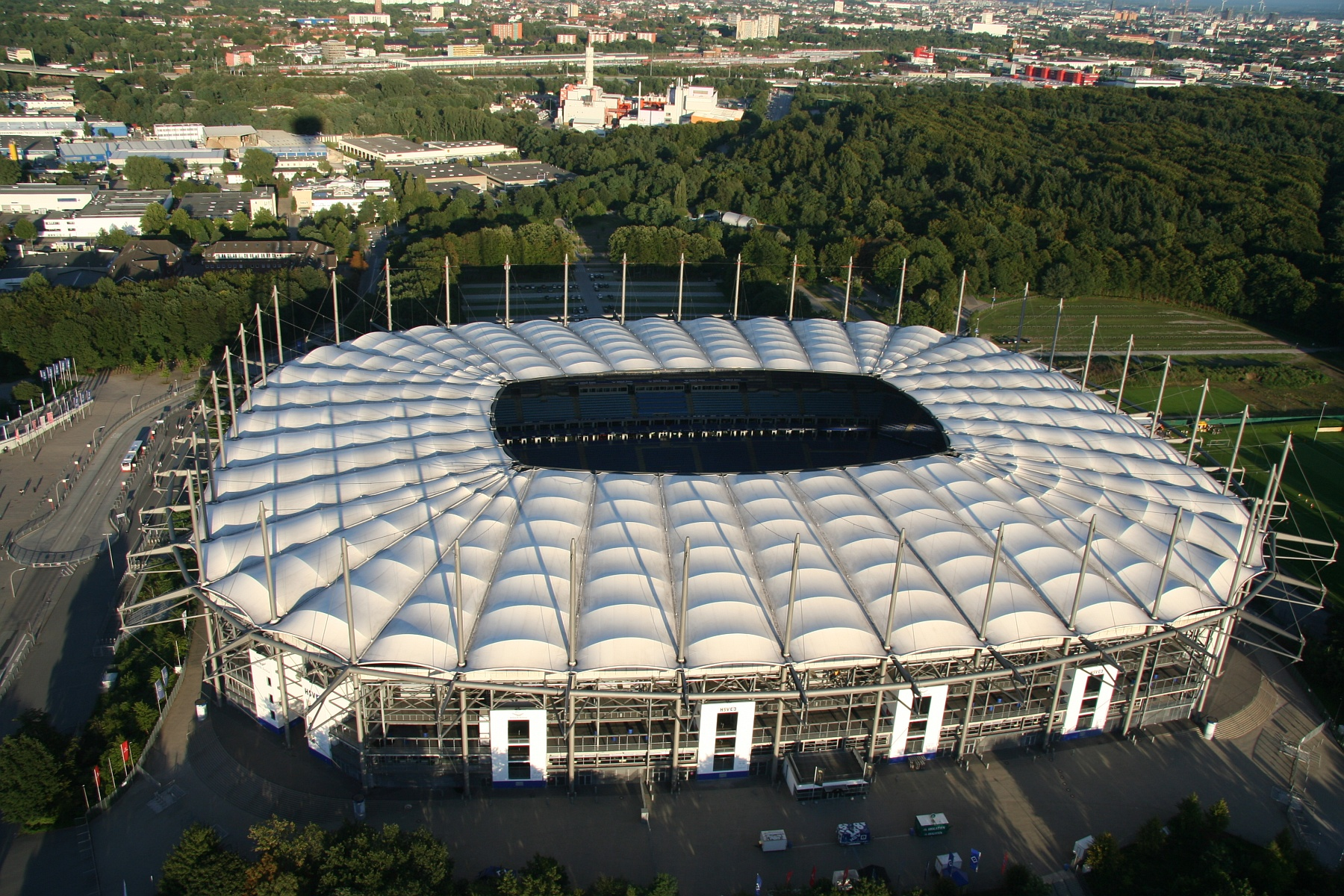
Volksparkstadion

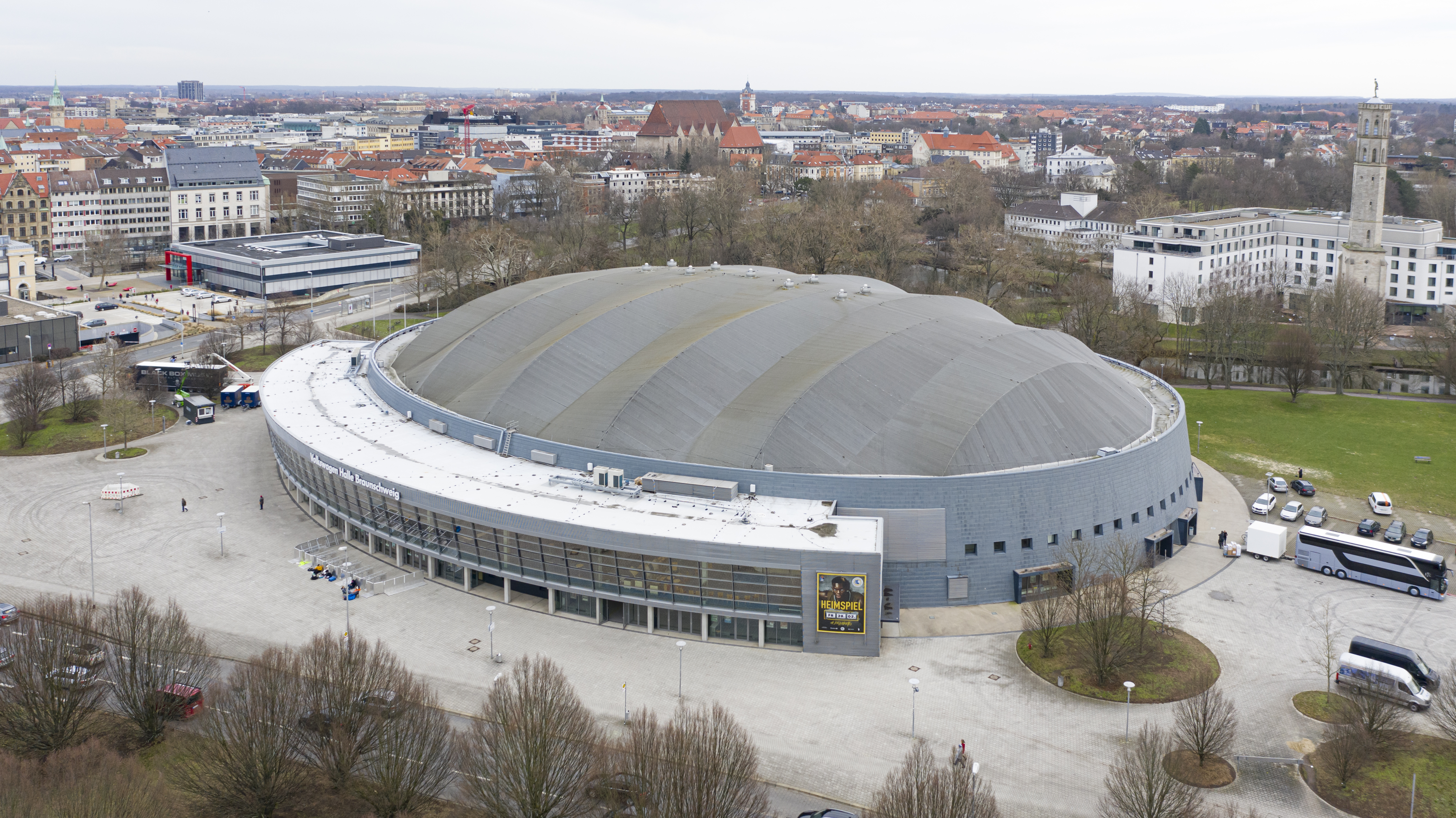
Volkswagen Halle

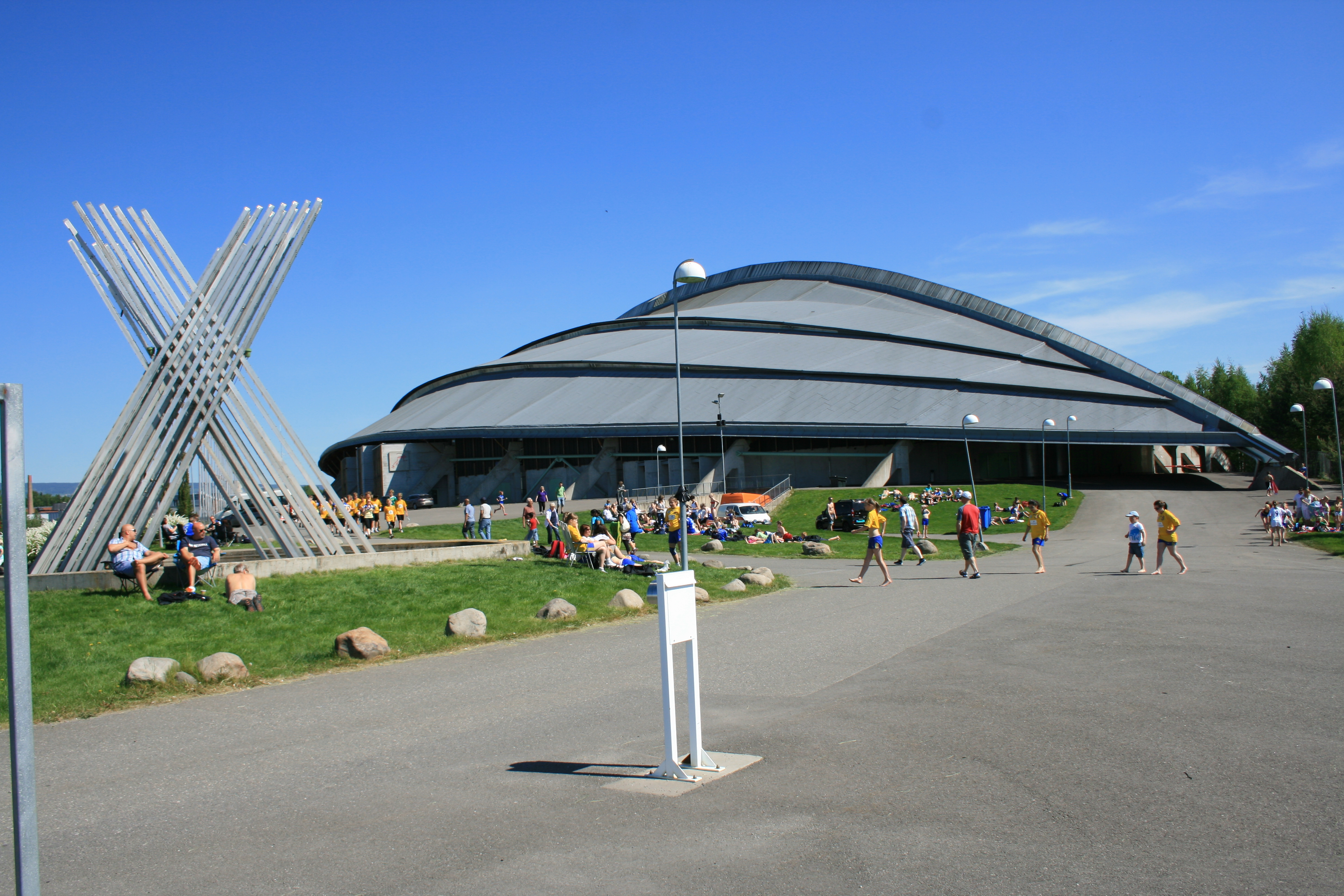
Vikingskipet

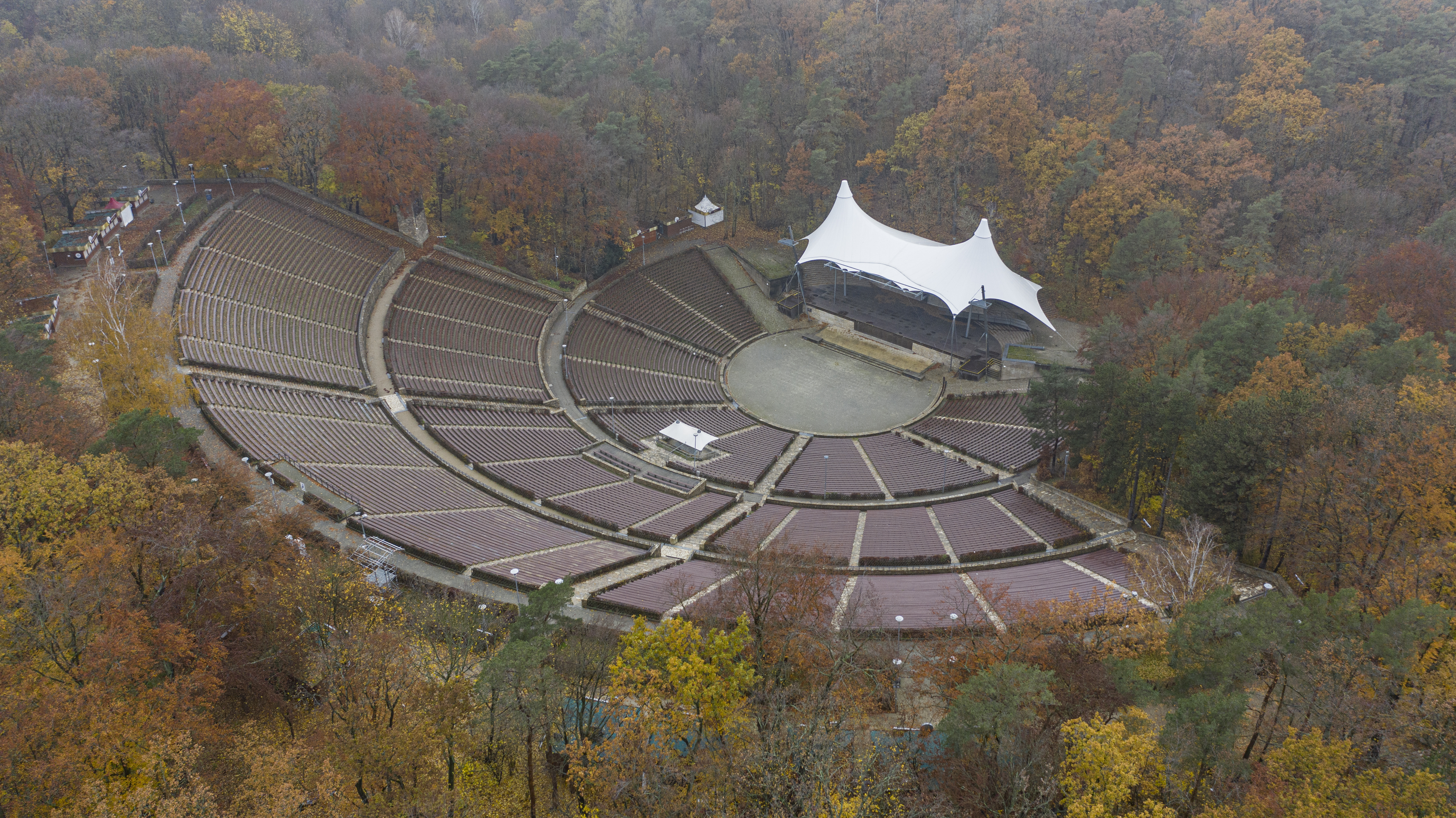
Waldbühne

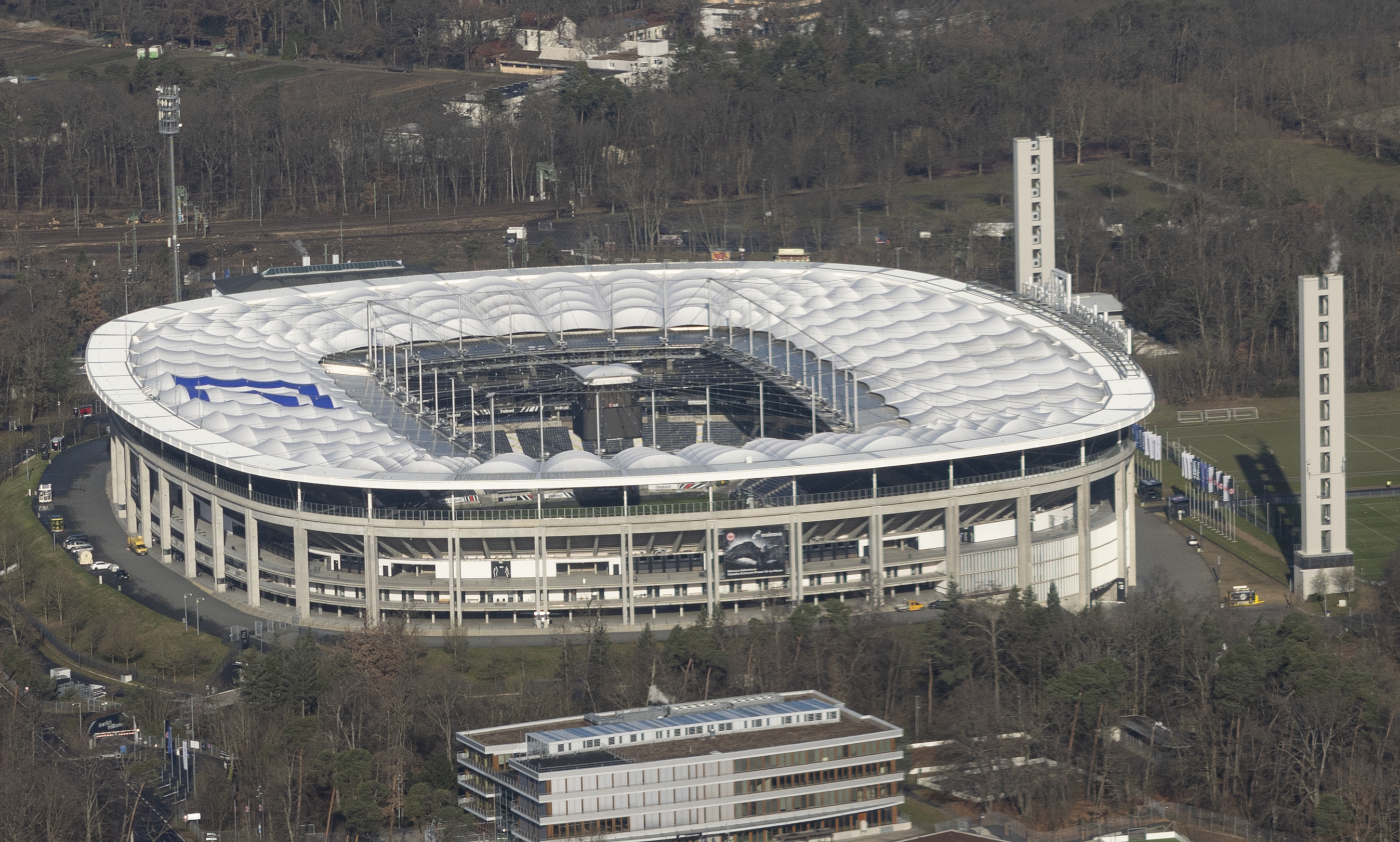
Waldstadion

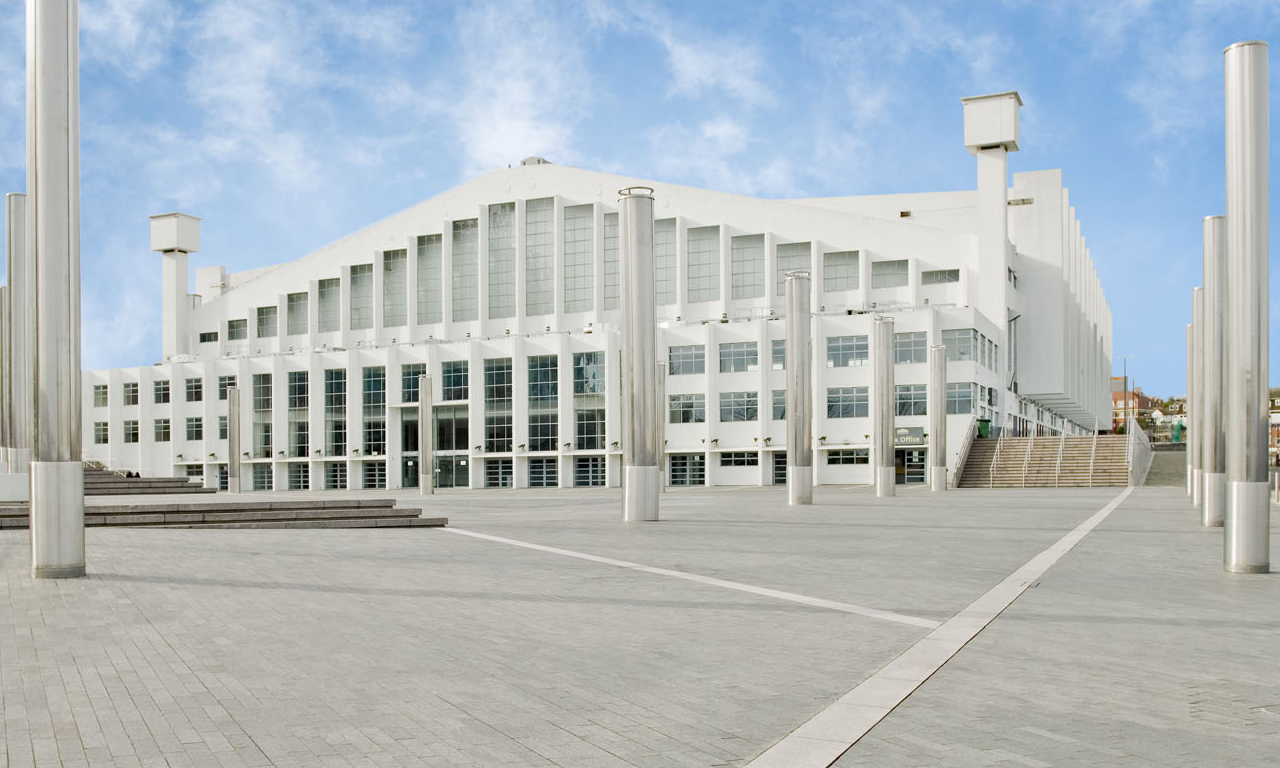
Wembley Arena

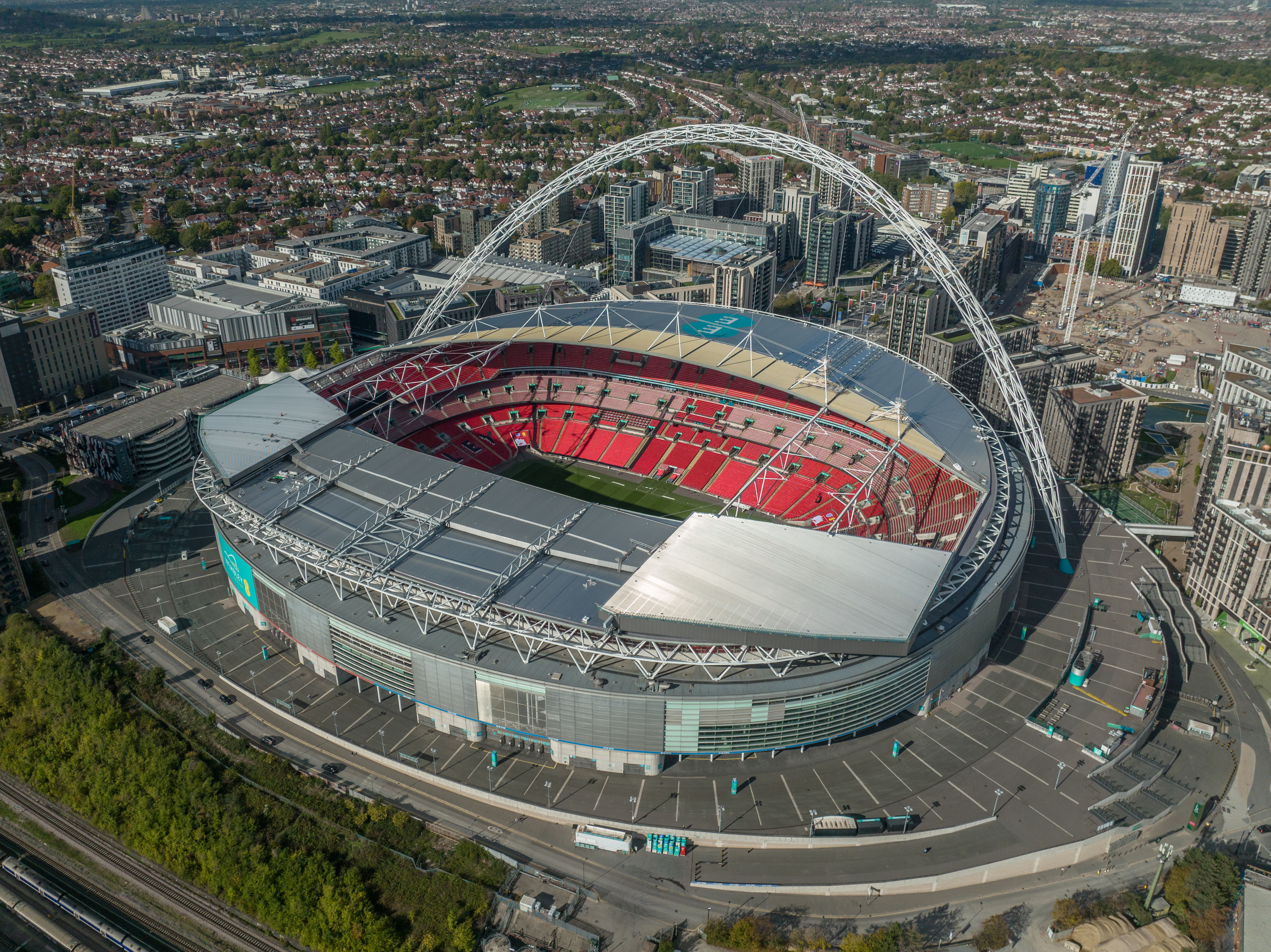
Wembley Stadium

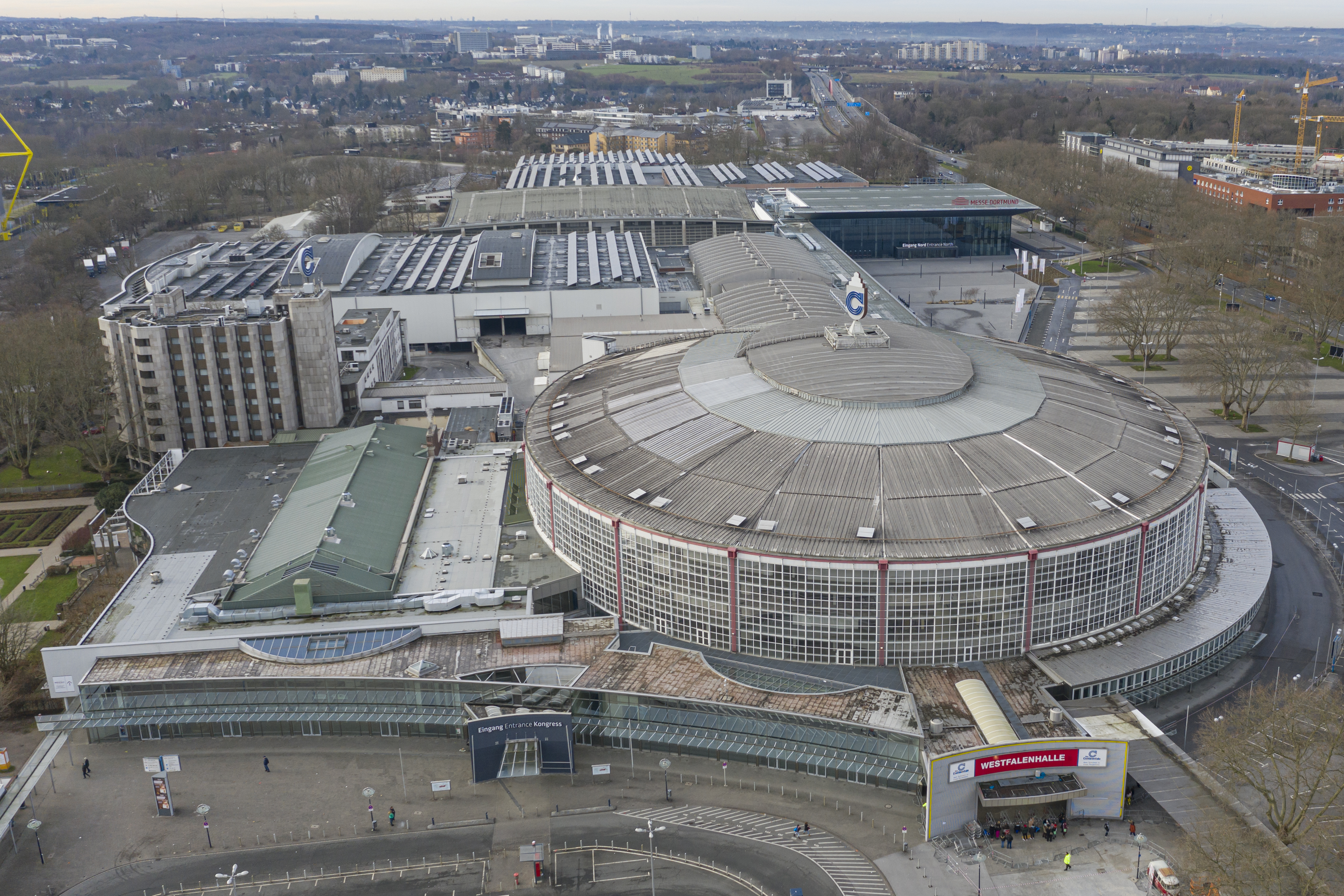
Westfalenhallen

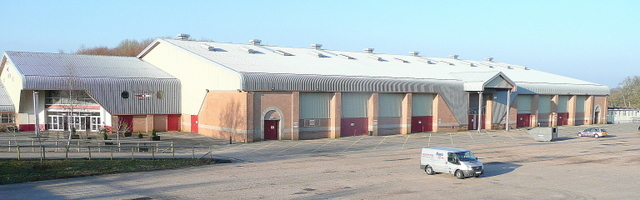
Westpoint Exeter

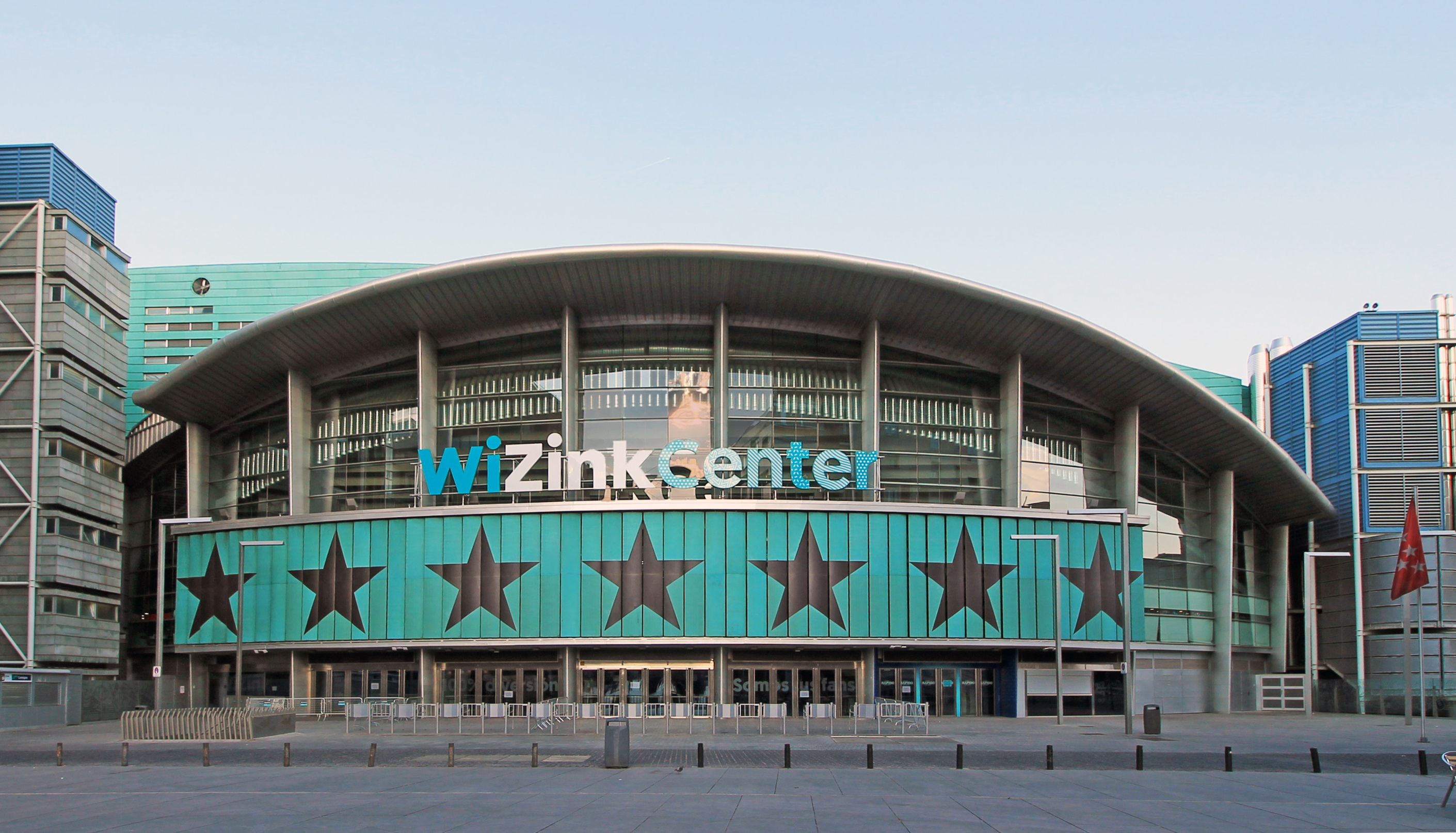
WiZink Center

Xiaomi Arena

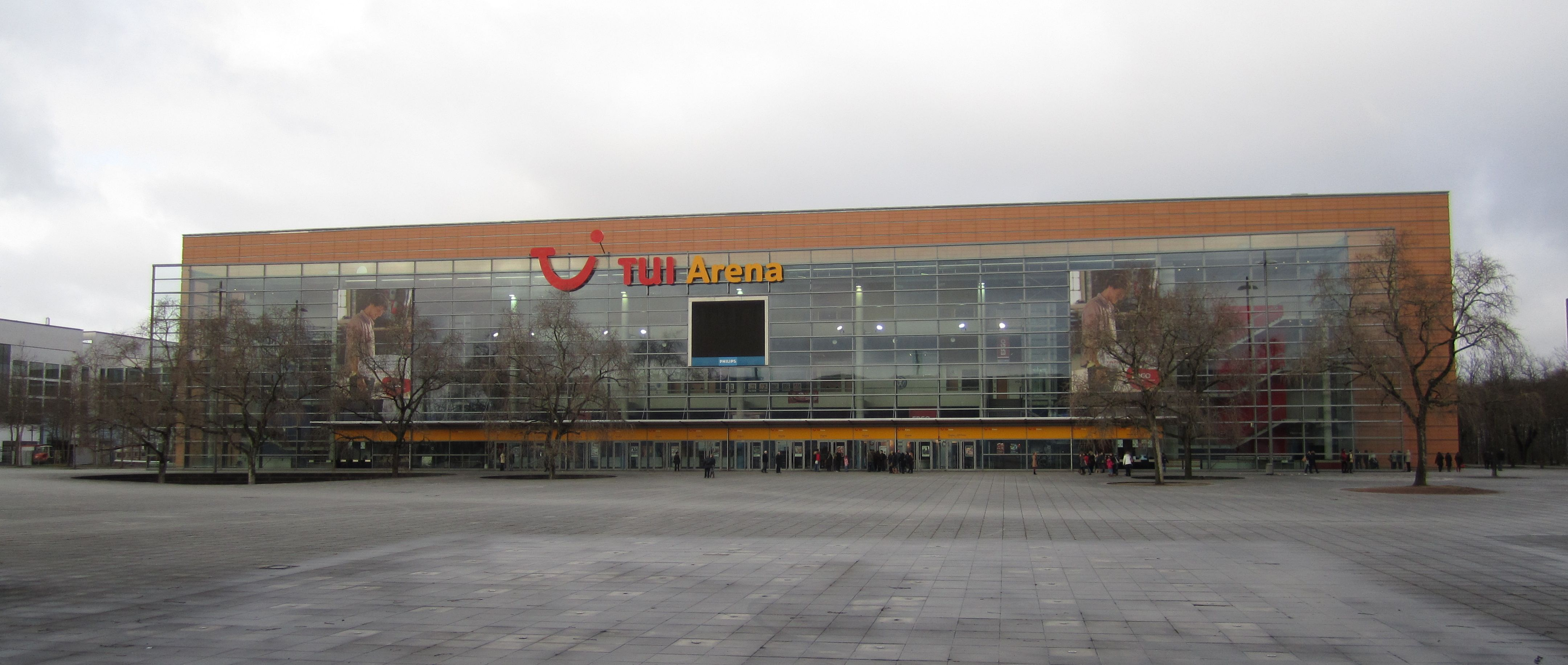
ZAG-Arena

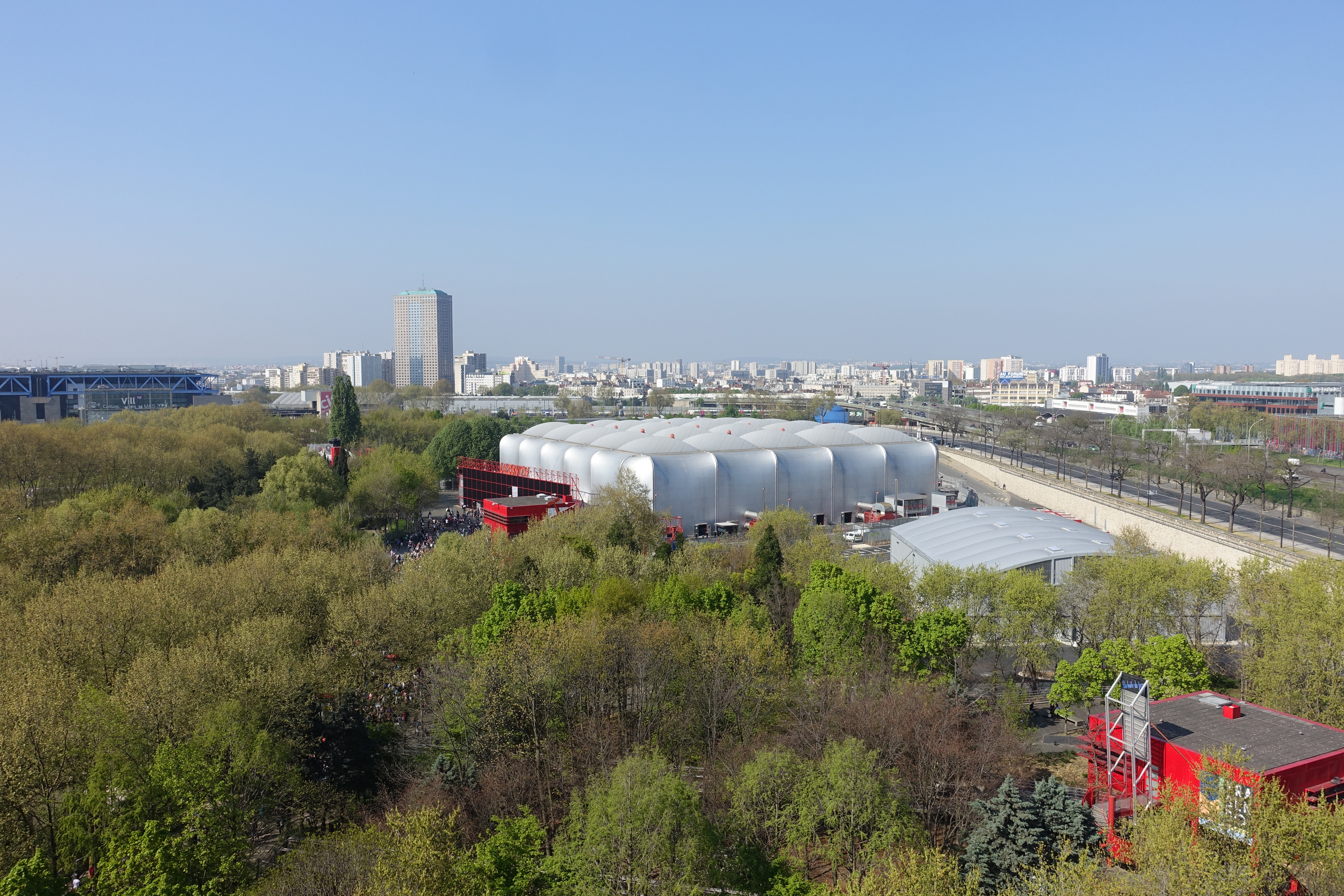
Zénith Paris

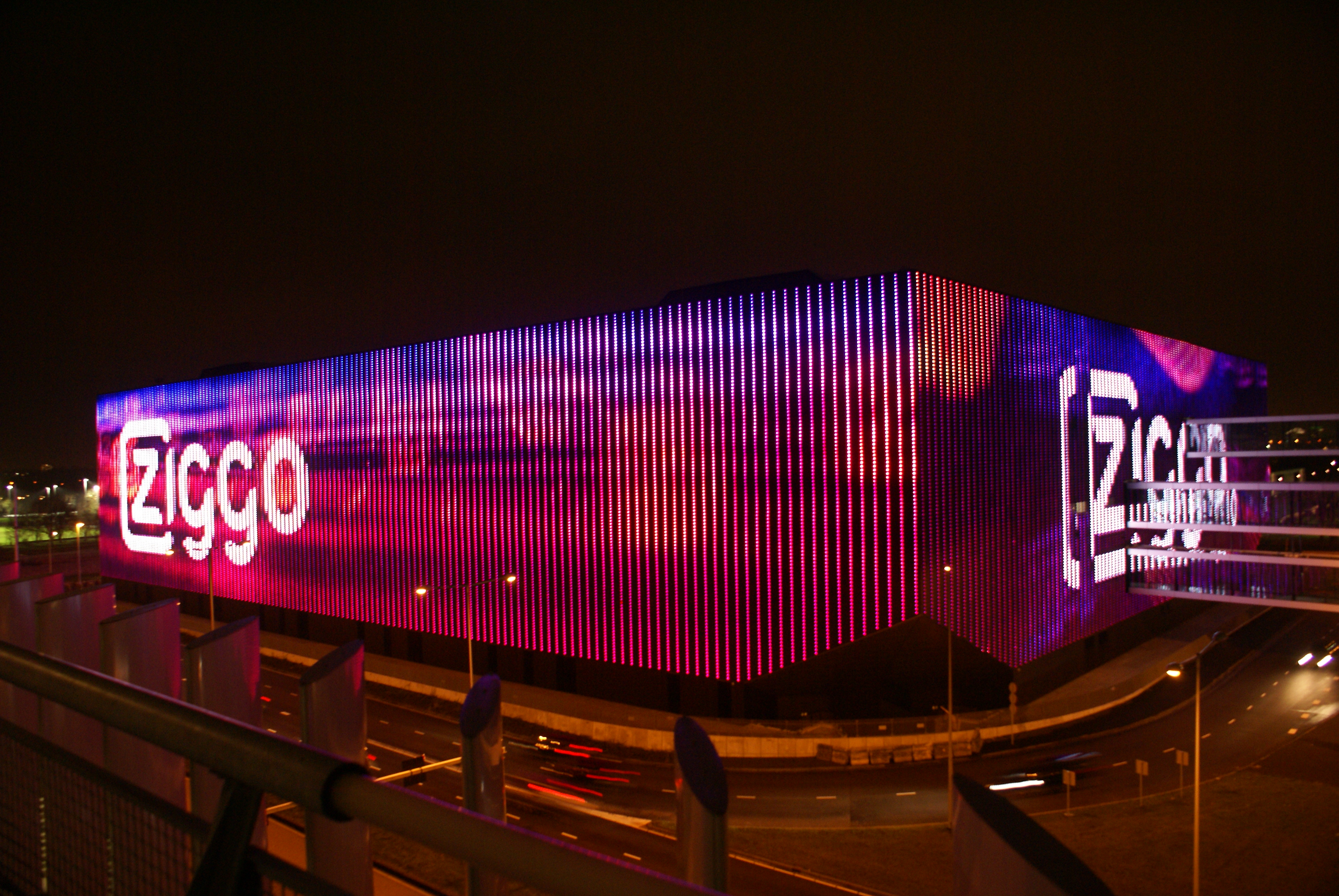
Ziggo Dome
