= Rise Against discography =

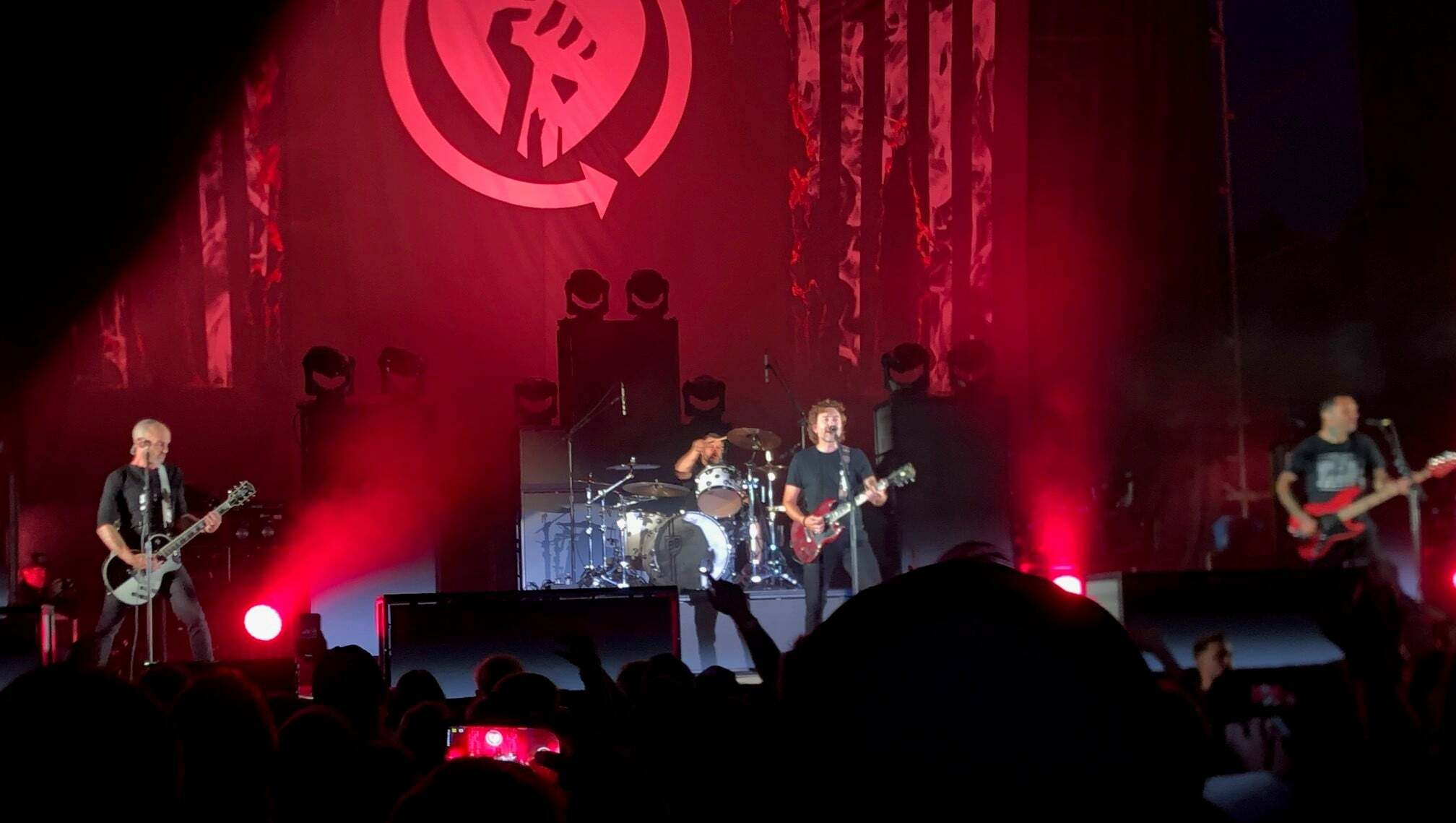
- Rise Against performing in Philadelphia in 2016
- Studio albums: 10
- Extended plays: 11
- Compilation albums: 2
- Singles: 20
- Music videos: 25
- Promotional singles: 4
- Video: 2

The discography of the American punk rock band Rise Against consists of ten studio albums, two compilation albums, eleven extended plays, twenty singles, four promotional singles, two documentaries, and twenty-five music videos. The band was formed in 1999, under the original name Transistor Revolt. After signing a recording contract with Fat Wreck Chords, they changed their name to Rise Against, and released The Unraveling in 2001, and Revolutions Per Minute in 2003. Rise Against switched to Geffen Records the following year, and made its major record label debut with Siren Song of the Counter Culture. In addition to becoming the band's first album to reach the Billboard 200, where it peaked at number 136, the success of the singles "Give It All" and "Swing Life Away" helped Rise Against achieve mainstream appeal.

The follow-up album was The Sufferer & the Witness in 2006. It peaked at number ten on the Billboard 200, and was the band's first album to chart in other countries. Rise Against's popularity continued to grow with its fifth album Appeal to Reason, released in 2008 by DGC and Interscope Records. The album charted highly, and sold over 482,000 copies by 2011. The third single from Appeal to Reason, "Savior", held the record for the most consecutive weeks spent on both the Hot Rock Songs and Alternative Songs charts, with sixty-three and sixty-five weeks respectively. (Note: "Sail" by Awolnation broke the longevity record on the Hot Rock Songs chart, where it spent ninety-six weeks.) Endgame, Rise Against's next album, was released in 2011. Continuing on the success of Appeal to Reason, it charted within the top ten in several countries, and remains Rise Against's most successful album chart-wise. After the release of the compilation album Long Forgotten Songs: B-Sides & Covers 2000–2013, the band recorded The Black Market in 2014, which reached number three in the United States, and was the third consecutive studio album to reach number one on the Canadian Albums Chart. Rise Against's eighth studio album, Wolves, was released in 2017, and their ninth album, Nowhere Generation, was released in 2021. Their tenth studio album, Ricochet, was released on August 14, 2025.

== Albums ==
=== Studio albums ===
List of studio albums, with selected chart positions and certifications
Title	Album details	Peak chart positions										Certifications
Title	Album details	US	AUS	AUT	CAN	FIN	GER	NZ	SWE	SWI	UK	Certifications
The Unraveling	Released: April 24, 2001 (US); Label: Fat Wreck Chords; Format: CD, LP, digital download	—	—	—	—	—	—	—	—	—	—	
Revolutions per Minute	Released: April 8, 2003 (US); Label: Fat Wreck Chords; Format: CD, LP, digital download	—	—	—	—	—	—	—	—	—	—	
Siren Song of the Counter Culture	Released: August 10, 2004 (US); Label: Geffen; Format: CD, LP, digital download	136	—	—	—	—	—	—	—	—	—	RIAA: Gold; ARIA: Gold; MC: Platinum; BVMI: Gold
The Sufferer & the Witness	Released: July 4, 2006 (US); Label: Geffen; Format: CD, LP, digital download	10	21	75	5	—	77	—	—	98	171	RIAA: Platinum; ARIA: Gold; MC: Platinum; BVMI: Gold; BPI: Silver
Appeal to Reason	Released: October 7, 2008 (US); Label: DGC/Interscope; Format: CD, LP, digital download	3	7	34	1	—	21	34	51	44	68	RIAA: Platinum; ARIA: Gold; MC: 2× Platinum; BVMI: Platinum; BPI: Silver; IFPI AUT: Platinum; RMNZ: Gold
Endgame	Released: March 15, 2011 (US); Label: DGC/Interscope; Format: CD, LP, digital download	2	2	3	1	42	1	6	6	12	27	ARIA: Gold; MC: Platinum; BVMI: Platinum; IFPI AUT: Platinum; RMNZ: Gold
The Black Market	Released: July 15, 2014 (US); Label: Interscope; Format: CD, LP, digital download	3	3	3	1	22	1	6	—	5	13	MC: Gold; BVMI: Gold
Wolves	Released: June 9, 2017 (US); Label: Virgin; Format: CD, LP, digital download, streaming	9	5	5	3	—	5	20	—	11	38	
Nowhere Generation	Released: June 4, 2021 (US); Label: Loma Vista; Format: CD, LP, digital download, streaming	39	4	3	30	—	2	—	—	4	19	
Ricochet	Released: August 15, 2025; Label: Loma Vista; Format: LP, digital download, streaming	—	51	6	—	—	10	—	—	18	—	
"—" denotes a recording that did not chart or was not released in that territory.

=== Compilation albums ===
List of compilation albums, with selected chart positions
Title	Album details	Peak chart positions							
Title	Album details	US	AUS	AUT	CAN	GER	SCO	SWI	UK
Long Forgotten Songs: B-Sides & Covers 2000–2013	Released: September 10, 2013 (US); Label: Interscope; Format: CD, CC, LP, digital download	19	16	7	4	7	65	33	73
The Ghost Note Symphonies, Vol. 1	Released: July 27, 2018 (US); Label: Virgin; Format: CD, LP, digital download	55	72	29	22	9	86	39	—

== Extended plays ==
List of extended plays
Title	EP details
Transistor Revolt	Released: 2000 (US) (Note: Transistor Revolt was released under the band's original name Transistor Revolt.); Label: Self-released; Format: CD
This Is Noise	Released: July 2, 2007 (US); Label: Geffen; Format: CD, digital download
Rise Against / Anti-Flag	Released: February 17, 2009 (US); Label: DGC; Format: 7" vinyl
Rise Against 7"	Released: May 12, 2009 (US); Label: Fat Wreck Chords; Format: 7" vinyl
Grammatizator	Released: October 20, 2009 (US); Label: DGC/Geffen; Format: Digital download
Join the Ranks	Released: April 16, 2011 (US); Label: Fat Wreck Chords; Format: 7" vinyl
Rise Against / Face to Face	Released: May 10, 2011 (US); Label: Folsom; Format: 7" vinyl
Satellite EP	Released: April 17, 2012 (US); Label: DGC; Format: Digital download
Live from the Honda Center	Released: September 6, 2013 (US) (Note: Live From The Honda Center was a limited release included in pre-orders for Long Forgotten Songs: B-Sides & Covers 2000–2013.); Label: Interscope; Format: 10" vinyl
Nowhere Sessions	Released: November 12, 2021 (US); Label: Loma Vista; Format:
Nowhere Generation II	Released: June 10, 2022 (US); Label: Loma Vista; Format: CD, digital download, streaming

== Singles ==
=== 2000's ===
List of singles, with selected chart positions and certifications, showing year released and album name
Title	Year	Peak chart positions									Certifications	Album
Title	Year	US	US Alt	US Main	US Rock	CAN	CAN Rock	SCO	UK Sales	UK Rock	Certifications	Album
"Give It All"	2004	—	37	—	—	—	—	—	—	—		Siren Song of the Counter Culture
"Swing Life Away"	2005	— (Note: "Swing Life Away" did not enter the Billboard Hot 100, but peaked at number seventeen on the Bubbling Under Hot 100 Singles chart, which acts as an extension to the Hot 100.)	12	—	—	—	—	—	—	—	RIAA: Gold	Siren Song of the Counter Culture
"Life Less Frightening"	2005	—	33	—	—	—	—	—	—	—		Siren Song of the Counter Culture
"Ready to Fall"	2006	—	13	—	—	—	50	—	—	6		The Sufferer & the Witness
"Prayer of the Refugee"	2006	—	7	—	—	—	26	—	—	—	RIAA: Platinum; BPI: Silver; RMNZ: Gold	The Sufferer & the Witness
"The Good Left Undone"	2007	—	6	—	—	—	29	—	—	—		The Sufferer & the Witness
"Re-Education (Through Labor)"	2008	— (Note: "Re-Education (Through Labor)" did not enter the Billboard Hot 100, but peaked at number twelve on the Bubbling Under Hot 100 Singles chart, which acts as an extension to the Hot 100.)	3	22	—	63	7	—	—	—	RIAA: Gold; RMNZ: Gold	Appeal to Reason
"Audience of One"	2009	—	4	—	16	59	4	43	32	—		Appeal to Reason
"Savior"	2009	— (Note: "Savior" did not enter the Billboard Hot 100, but peaked at number two on the Bubbling Under Hot 100 Singles chart, which acts as an extension to the Hot 100.)	3	18	3	68	9	—	—	—	RIAA: Platinum; BPI: Platinum; RMNZ: 2× Platinum	Appeal to Reason
"—" denotes a recording that did not chart or was not released in that territory.

=== 2010's ===
List of singles, with selected chart positions and certifications, showing year released and album name
Title	Year	Peak chart positions											Certifications	Album
Title	Year	US	US Alt	US Main	US Rock	AUS	CAN	CAN Rock	CZ Rock	MEX	UK Sales	UK Rock	Certifications	Album
"Help Is on the Way"	2011	89	2	6	2	—	45	9	4	47	—	19		Endgame
"Make It Stop (September's Children)"	2011	—	6	16	8	—	—	18	12	29	—	—		Endgame
"Satellite"	2011	—	7	17	7	—	—	21	3	—	—	—	RMNZ: Gold	Endgame
"I Don't Want to Be Here Anymore"	2014	—	13	5	21	69	92	5	13	—	—	11		The Black Market
"Tragedy + Time"	2014	—	26	28	— (Note: "Tragedy + Time" did not enter the Billboard Hot Rock & Alternative Songs chart, but peaked at number 24 on the Rock & Alternative Airplay chart.)	—	—	47	—	—	—	—		The Black Market
"The Eco-Terrorist in Me"	2015	—	—	—	— (Note: "The Eco-Terrorist in Me" did not enter the Billboard Hot Rock & Alternative Songs chart, but peaked at number 30 on the Rock Digital Song Sales chart.)	—	—	—	—	—	56	24		The Black Market
"The Violence"	2017	—	15	2	26	—	—	7	5	—	—	—		Wolves
"House on Fire"	2018	—	15	8	35	—	—	44	4	—	—	—		Wolves
"—" denotes a recording that did not chart or was not released in that territory

=== 2020's ===
List of singles, with selected chart positions and certifications, showing year released and album name
Title	Year	Peak chart positions							Album
Title	Year	US Alt	US Hard Rock	US Main	US Rock	CAN Rock	CZ Rock	UK Sales	Album
"Broken Dreams, Inc"	2020	—	25	—	—	—	—	—	Nowhere Generation
"Nowhere Generation"	2021	9	1	1	27	1	—	3	Nowhere Generation
"Talking to Ourselves"	2021	21	25	25	—	15	20	—	Nowhere Generation
"Last Man Standing"	2022	—	—	—	—	—	3	—	Nowhere Generation II
"Nod"	2025	28	15	38	—	—	—	—	Ricochet
"I Want It All"	2025	38	—	18	—	—	—	—	Ricochet
"Katy Bar the Door"	2026	—	—	—	—	—	—	—	TBA
"Living Undercover"	2026	—	—	—	—	—	—	—	TBA
"—" denotes a recording that did not chart or was not released in that territory.

=== Promotional singles ===
List of promotional singles, with selected chart positions, showing year released and album name
Title	Year	Peak chart positions						Album
Title	Year	US	US Alt	US Hard Rock	US Main	US Rock	CAN Rock	Album
"Like the Angel"	2003	—	—	—	—	—	—	Revolutions per Minute
"Architects"	2011	— (Note: "Architects" did not enter the Billboard Hot 100, but peaked at number nineteen on the Bubbling Under Hot 100 Singles chart, which acts as an extension to the Hot 100.)	— (Note: "Architects" did not enter the Billboard Alternative Airplay chart, but peaked at number nine on the Alternative Digital Song Sales chart.)	—	—	— (Note: "Architects" did not enter the Billboard Hot Rock & Alternative Songs chart, but peaked at number 17 on the Rock Digital Song Sales chart.)	—	Endgame
"Wait for Me"	2012	—	14	—	10	14	50	Endgame
"The Numbers"	2021	—	—	23	—	—	—	Nowhere Generation
"Prizefighter"	2025	—	—	—	—	—	—	Ricochet
"—" denotes a recording that did not chart or was not released in that territory.

== Other charted songs ==
List of other charted songs, with selected chart positions showing year released and album name
Title	Year	Peak chart positions				Certifications	Album
Title	Year	US Hard Rock DL	US Rock DL	CAN Rock	SWE	Certifications	Album
"Long Forgotten Sons"	2009	—	—	28	—		Appeal to Reason
"Hero of War"	2009	—	—	—	4	RMNZ: Platinum	Appeal to Reason
"Endgame"	2011	18	—	—	—		Endgame
"Death Blossoms"	2013	4	44	—	—		Long Forgotten Songs: B-Sides & Covers 2000–2013
"—" denotes a recording that did not chart or was not released in that territory.

== Videography ==
=== Documentaries ===
List of documentaries
Title	Album details	Notes
Generation Lost	Released: December 5, 2006 (US); Label: Geffen; Formats: DVD	Live performances, interviews, music videos, and behind the scenes
Another Station: Another Mile	Released: October 5, 2010 (US); Label: DGC/Interscope; Formats: DVD	Live performances and interviews

=== Music videos ===
List of music videos, with the director and year released
Title	Year	Director(s)	Ref.
"Heaven Knows"	2003	Bob Trondson	
"Give It All"	2004	James Cox	
"Swing Life Away"	2005	Estevan Oriol	
"Ready To Fall"	2006	Kevin Kerslake	
"Prayer of the Refugee"	2006	Tony Petrossian	
"Behind Closed Doors"	2006	Tony Petrossian	
"The Good Left Undone"	2007	NEON	
"Re-Education (Through Labor)"	2008	Kevin Kerslake	
"Audience of One"	2008	Brett Simon	
"Hero of War"	2009	Meiert Avis	
"Savior"	2009	Kevin Kerslake	
"Help Is On the Way"	2011	Alan Ferguson	
"Make It Stop (September's Children)"	2011	Marc Klasfeld	
"Satellite"	2011	Marc Klasfeld	
"Ballad of Hollis Brown"	2012	Nico Sabenorio	
"I Don't Want To Be Here Anymore"	2014	Nico Sabenorio	
"Tragedy + Time"	2014	Wes Kandel, Casey Hupke	
"People Live Here"	2016	Tyler W. Davis	
"House on Fire"	2018	Daniel Carberry	
"Megaphone"	2018	INDECLINE	
"Bullshit"	2018	INDECLINE	
"Nowhere Generation"	2021	Brian Roettinger	
"Talking to Ourselves"	2021	Brian Roettinger	
"Talking to Ourselves" (version 2)	2022	Ryan Valdez	
"Last Man Standing"	2022	Ryan Valdez	
"Pain Mgmt"	2022	INDECLINE	
"Nod"	2025		
"Prizefighter"	2025		
"I Want It All"	2025	George Gallardo Kattah	
"Ricochet"	2025	Kai Dickson	
