= Ricochet (Rise Against album) =

Studio album by Rise Against
- Released: August 15, 2025
- Length: 41:18
- Label: Loma Vista
- Producer: Catherine Marks

Rise Against chronology
Nowhere Generation II (2022)	Ricochet (2025)

Rise Against studio album chronology
Nowhere Generation (2021)	Ricochet (2025)

Singles from Ricochet
- 1. "Nod" Released: January 24, 2025; 2. "Prizefighter" Released: April 3, 2025; 3. "I Want It All" Released: May 28, 2025; 4. "Ricochet" Released: August 15, 2025

Ricochet is the tenth studio album by American punk rock band Rise Against. Released on August 15, 2025, it is their first produced by Catherine Marks. Prior to the album's announcement, the band released two singles; "Nod" on January 24, 2025, and "Prizefighter" on April 3, 2025. A third single, "I Want It All", was released alongside the announcement of the album on May 28, 2025.

== Background ==
Following the end of support for their previous album, Nowhere Generation, Rise Against elected work with a new production team. The band chose Australian producer Catherine Marks, best known for her work with Manchester Orchestra and Boygenius, as well as mixing engineer Alan Moulder. With a new production team, the band began writing songs that were a bit less traditional from their usual sound.

In a press statement following the album's announcement, frontman Tim McIlrath detailed the themes that the album tackles, primarily being focused on the interconnectedness of modern day society and how accessible news, government, and other people are:

"Ricochet is about our collective inter-connectedness. We started with the title track and that being about how we're all —whether we like it or not —stuck in the same room, so to speak. Everything you do is going to affect somebody; everything you throw will affect the next person. We're connected to other countries, other economies; we're connected to undocumented immigrants. We're connected to every decision our leaders make. It's all one big ricochet effect. That idea is the backbone of this album."- Tim McIlrath

== Release ==
Rise Against began to tease new music towards the end of 2024, but would not release any new music until the following year with the album's lead single "Nod" on January 24, 2025. This was followed by "Prizefighter" on April 3, 2025 and "I Want It All" on May 28, 2025, with the album being announced alongside the latter. Ricochet released on August 15, 2025.

== Track listing ==
All music is composed by Rise Against; "Ricochet", "I Want It All" and "Prizefighter" composed with Jennifer Decilveo; "Black Crown" composed with Andy Hull.

Ricochet track listing
No.	Title	Lyrics	Length
1.	"Nod"	Tim McIlrath	3:02
2.	"I Want It All"	Tim McIlrath; Jennifer Decilveo	3:06
3.	"Ricochet"	McIlrath; Decilveo	3:41
4.	"Damage Is Done"	McIlrath	3:43
5.	"Us Against the World"	McIlrath	3:21
6.	"Black Crown" (featuring Andy Hull)	McIlrath; Andy Hull	3:20
7.	"Sink Like a Stone"	McIlrath	4:07
8.	"Forty Days"	McIlrath	3:23
9.	"State of Emergency"	McIlrath	3:30
10.	"Gold Long Gone"	McIlrath	3:19
11.	"Soldier"	McIlrath	3:46
12.	"Prizefighter"	McIlrath; Decilveo	3:20
Total length:			41:38

Amazon exclusive bonus tracks
No.	Title	Length
13.	"Nod" (live)
14.	"Prayer of the Refugee" (live)

== Personnel ==
Credits adapted from Tidal.

=== Rise Against ===
- Brandon Barnes – drums
- Zach Blair – guitar, background vocals
- Tim McIlrath – lead vocals, guitar, background vocals on "Nod"
- Joe Principe – bass guitar, background vocals

=== Additional contributors ===
- Catherine Marks – production, engineering (all tracks); programming and synthesizer on "I Want It All" and "Prizefighter"
- Alan Moulder – mixing
- Fin Howells – mixing on "Nod"
- Matt Colton – mastering
- Zach Fisher – engineering
- Nathan Van Fleet – engineering assistance
- Andy Hull – guest vocalist on "Black Crown"

== Charts ==
Chart performance for Ricochet
Chart (2025)	Peak position
Australian Albums (ARIA)	51
Austrian Albums (Ö3 Austria)	6
French Rock & Metal Albums (SNEP)	34
German Albums (Offizielle Top 100)	10
German Rock & Metal Albums (Offizielle Top 100)	4
Scottish Albums (Official Charts)	51
Swiss Albums (Schweizer Hitparade)	18
UK Albums Sales (OCC)	15
UK Rock & Metal Albums (Official Charts)	4
US Top Album Sales (Billboard)	19
