= Broken Dreams, Inc =

Single by Rise Against

from the album Nowhere Generation
- Released: September 16, 2020
- Genre: Hardcore punk; melodic hardcore
- Length: 3:53
- Label: Loma Vista
- Songwriters: Tim McIlrath; Joe Principe; Brandon Barnes; Zach Blair
- Producers: Bill Stevenson; Jason Livermore; Andrew Berlin; Chris Beeble

Rise Against singles chronology
"House on Fire" (2018)	"Broken Dreams, Inc" (2020)	"Nowhere Generation" (2021)

"Broken Dreams, Inc" is a song by American punk rock band Rise Against. It was released on September 16, 2020 as the lead single for the soundtrack of the DC Comics series Dark Nights: Death Metal, and eventually became the first single for the band's ninth studio album, Nowhere Generation.

== Background ==
"Broken Dreams, Inc" was written about opportunity inequalities amongst Americans, and putting power back into the hands of the citizens instead of corporations. Rise Against frontman, Tim Mcllrath, detailed the song's meaning more in a press statement:

"'Broken Dreams, Inc.' speaks to today's changing landscape of American society, the opportunities that are available to some but not to others, the people who are able to benefit versus those who get left behind, who suffer and end up as casualties. How do we level the playing field so everyone can have a real chance at attaining the American Dream? One word, 'disruption.' You have to put power into the hands of the people, not business, you have to value people and community over profit. You can't have a shareholder-run country or a shareholder-run world, a world that values profit above all else, because profit above all else can result in dangerous repercussions for humankind." – Tim Mcllrath

== Release and reception ==
Both Mcllrath and lead guitarist Zach Blair grew up being big fans of DC Comics, with Batman being one of their personal favorites, so the band were incredibly excited to be able to collaborate on the Dark Nights: Death Metal series. In promotion with the series, the song was released on September 16, 2020 as the lead single for the series soundtrack, while Mcllrath also went on to voice Lobo in the Sonic Metalverse video series.

"Broken Dreams, Inc" was met with positive feedback upon release, with Kerrang! calling the song "brilliant." Marcie Bennett of American Songwriter briefly discussed the band's reputation for social awareness before stating that the song "holds all of these ideas and is drawn out even more so with the heroic/villain elements that illuminate the song's themes."

== Music video ==
A music video was released alongside the song, which features art drawn by DC Comics artist Greg Capullo. The video is primarily composed of art from the comic series, and features notable DC characters such as, but not limited to, Batman, Wonder Woman, Harley Quinn, The Joker, Superman, Aquaman, The Flash, Darkseid, and Green Lantern. During the video, monologues can be heard from the various characters relating to the series.

== Charts ==
Weekly chart performance for "Carry You Home"
Chart (2020)	Peak position
US Hot Hard Rock Songs (Billboard)	25

== Personnel ==
Rise Against

- Tim McIlrath – lead vocals, rhythm guitar
- Zach Blair – lead guitar, backing vocals
- Joe Principe – bass guitar, backing vocals
- Brandon Barnes – drums, percussion

Production

- Bill Stevenson – production, engineer
- Jason Livermore – production, engineer, mixing
- Andrew Berlin – production, engineer
- Chris Beeble – production, engineer
- Ted Jensen – mastering
- Jonathan Luginbill – engineer

Additional musicians

- Chad Price – backing vocals
