= The Ghost Note Symphonies, Vol. 1 =

Compilation album by Rise Against
- Released: July 27, 2018
- Studio: The Blasting Room (Fort Collins, Colorado)
- Genre: Acoustic
- Length: 37:10
- Label: Virgin
- Producer: Bill Stevenson; Jason Livermore; Chris Beeble; Andrew Berlin

Rise Against chronology
Wolves (2017)	The Ghost Note Symphonies, Vol. 1 (2018)	Nowhere Generation (2021)

Rise Against compilation album chronology
Long Forgotten Songs: B-Sides & Covers 2000–2013 (2013)	The Ghost Note Symphonies, Vol. 1 (2018)

Professional ratings
Review scores
Source	Rating
AllMusic	3.5/5 stars
Alternative Addiction	4/5 stars
Kerrang!	4/5 stars

The Ghost Note Symphonies, Vol. 1 is a compilation album by American rock band Rise Against. It was released on July 27, 2018. The album features reimagined versions of previously released Rise Against songs, with acoustic orchestration and alternative instrumentation.

Rise Against recorded songs for The Ghost Note Symphonies, Vol. 1 at the Blasting Room in Fort Collins, Colorado, with producers Bill Stevenson and Jason Livermore. To promote the album, the band released an acoustic rendition of their 2017 song, "House on Fire" on May 18.

On June 8 the band released an acoustic rendition of Like the Angel, promoted by the related videoclip. On July 13, an acoustic rendition of the song Voices Off Camera was released. The original version of this song is also part of the album Revolutions per Minute and was announced via a video trailer on the band's Facebook page.

== Background ==
In a 2018 interview with HMV, singer Tim McIlrath noted how Rise Against fans had been asking for an acoustic album for several years, and although the band considered recording one, they did not have enough time in their schedule to properly record one. After the release of Wolves in June 2017, the band members had some free time to record new material, and they decided to record a couple of acoustic bonus tracks. Rise Against booked a twelve day long session at the Blasting Room with producers Bill Stevenson and Jason Livermore.

The album's title is derived from a lyrics from "Parts Per Million," a song from Wolves.

== Track listing ==
All lyrics written by Tim McIlrath; all music composed by Rise Against.

No.	Title	Length
1.	"The Violence"	4:20
2.	"Audience of One"	4:08
3.	"Faint Resemblance"	2:22
4.	"House on Fire"	3:24
5.	"Like the Angel"	3:15
6.	"Miracle"	4:02
7.	"Savior"	4:54
8.	"Wait for Me"	3:51
9.	"Far from Perfect"	3:53
10.	"Voices Off Camera"	3:01
Total length:		37:10

== Personnel ==
Credits adapted from AllMusic

Rise Against

- Tim McIlrath – lead vocals, acoustic guitar, ukulele
- Zach Blair – acoustic guitar
- Joe Principe – acoustic bass guitar
- Brandon Barnes – drums, percussion

Additional musicians

- Chris Beeble – string arrangements
- Andrew Berlin – acoustic guitar, piano, string arrangements
- Jeb Bows – violin
- John Grigsby – upright bass
- Phil Norman – cello
- Adrienne Short – violin

Production

- Bill Stevenson – production, engineering
- Jason Livermore – production, engineering, mixing, mastering
- Chris Beeble – engineering, production
- Andrew Berlin – engineering, production

Additional personnel

- Nicole Frantz – creative director
- Ryan Del Vecchio – A&R
- David Wolter – A&R

== Charts ==
Chart (2018)	Peak position
Australian Albums (ARIA)	72
Austrian Albums (Ö3 Austria)	29
Belgian Albums (Ultratop Flanders)	66
Canadian Albums (Billboard)	22
German Albums (Offizielle Top 100)	9
Scottish Albums (OCC)	86
Swiss Albums (Schweizer Hitparade)	39
US Billboard 200	55
