= The Unraveling (Rise Against album) =

Studio album by Rise Against
- Released: April 24, 2001
- Recorded: December 2000
- Studio: Sonic Iguana Studios (Lafayette, Indiana)
- Genre: Melodic hardcore; hardcore punk
- Length: 36:40
- Label: Fat Wreck Chords
- Producer: Mass Giorgini

Rise Against chronology
| The Unraveling (2001) | Revolutions per Minute (2003) |

The Unraveling is the debut studio album by American punk rock band Rise Against, released on April 24, 2001, by Fat Wreck Chords. Following the release of the extended play Transistor Revolt in 2000, the band signed with Fat Wreck Chords and began working on the album at Sonic Iguana Studios with producer Mass Giorgini. Musically, The Unraveling is rooted in melodic hardcore, which later came to be the band's signature style; conversely, its lyrics differ from their more politically-driven later work, focusing more on personal relationships and issues.

Although it failed to peak within any record charts, The Unraveling received positive reviews from music critics. It is the band's only album featuring lead guitarist Dan Wleklinski, who left the band due to personal differences with lead vocalist Tim McIlrath, and was eventually replaced with Todd Mohney. In 2005, Fat Wreck Chords reissued The Unraveling to coincide with Rise Against's fifth anniversary.

== Background and recording ==
Rise Against was formed in 1999 after the dissolution of the Chicago punk rock band 88 Fingers Louie. Bassist Joe Principe and guitarist Dan Wleklinski were still interested in making music, and decided to start a new band. The two recruited drummer Toni Tintari, guitarist Kevin White, and lead vocalist Tim McIlrath, the former lead vocalist of the punk band Baxter. They called themselves Transistor Revolt, and released the extended play Transistor Revolt in 2000. Transistor Revolt garnered the attention of Fat Mike, the co-founder of the independent record label Fat Wreck Chords. He signed the band to a recording contract in 2000, with the stipulation they change their name; the band members ultimately decided on the name Rise Against.

After signing with Fat Wreck Chords, Tintari and White left Rise Against; Tintari was replaced by Brandon Barnes shortly thereafter. With a new drummer, the band members began to work on The Unraveling at Sonic Iguana Studios in Lafayette, Indiana, where Principe and Wleklinski had previously recorded material for 88 Fingers Louie. Recording took place over the course of five weeks, with Mass Giorgini serving as the producer, and Wleklinski serving as the assistant engineer. Wleklinski later remarked on the grueling workdays: "12-hour days for 4 of those weeks, and then 22-24 hours per day during that last week of tracking. These were the times of 'If you don't play it right, you have to play it again,' not 'That was good enough, I'll edit it so it's on time.'" Wleklinski also commented that it was difficult to split his time between recording guitar parts and engineering the songs, and that during the last week he had to sleep on the studio floor.

== Style and composition ==
"The Art of Losing"
"The Art of Losing" has a fast pace and hardcore sound.

"The Unraveling"
"The Unraveling" is a more conventional sounding song.

The Unraveling is primarily a melodic hardcore record, with influences of punk rock and hardcore punk. Shawn Merrill of Exclaim! compared the album to works by other punk rock bands like Agnostic Front, Bad Religion, Gorilla Biscuits, and Minor Threat. The Unraveling begins with a quote by actor and musician Jack Black asking the listener "Are you ready to rock?", taken from the 1996 film The Cable Guy. It then transitions into the first track "Alive and Well", a fast-paced song that combines screaming vocals with melodies in the chorus. Davey Boy of Sputnikmusic considers the second track, "My Life Inside Your Heart", to be the most accessible song on the album, while "Great Awakening" has a "frantic pace" with a hardcore sound. The next song "Six Ways 'Til Sunday" is more inspired by punk rock, with a long closing group chant.

Boy notes that tracks five through ten alternate between short hardcore songs like "The Art of Losing" and "Remains of Summer Memories", and more conventional sounding songs like "The Unraveling". The eleventh track, "Everchanging", begins with minimal background music to highlight McIlrath's vocals. After two more hardcore songs, "1000 Good Intentions" begins playing, which James Benwell of Drowned in Sound compared to "Everchanging". Boy adds that the track is reminiscent of the sound of future Rise Against albums, with its punk base combined with more mainstream rock influence. The final two tracks, "Weight of Time" and "Faint Resemblance", close the album in a "nice summation of everything that has come before them", according to Boy. Lyrically, The Unraveling is intended to be thought-provoking, with themes ranging from "friendships and relationships [to] religion and memories".

== Release and reception ==
=== Release ===
Fat Wreck Chords released The Unraveling on April 24, 2001, in the United States on CD and LP formats; the original 2001 CD pressing is currently out of print. It failed to reach any major music chart, and did not produce a single. Since the album's release, some of its songs have been featured in compilation albums and other media. An acoustic rendition of "Everchanging" was included on the Warped Tour 2006 Tour Compilation and the European track listing of the 2007 extended play This Is Noise. "The Art of Losing" and "My Life Inside Your Heart" were to be used in the unreleased video game Propeller Arena.

To promote The Unraveling, Rise Against toured extensively throughout North America and Europe. While on tour, Wleklinski left the band due to personal differences with McIlrath. Rumor spread that Wleklinski was fired because of his long hair, although McIlrath derided these claims. Phillip Hill stood in as lead guitarist, and Kevin White was eventually hired as a replacement. A few months later, White left the band, and Todd Mohney was recruited as the new lead guitarist.

In 2005, Fat Wreck Chords reissued The Unraveling on CD and digital download format to coincide with the band's fifth anniversary. It was remixed and remastered by Bill Stevenson and Jason Livermore at The Blasting Room in Fort Collins, Colorado, with two bonus songs ("Join the Ranks" and "Gethsemane"), updated photography, and additional album liner information. Mohney plays lead guitar on "Gethsemane", as the track was recorded after Wlekinski's departure.

=== Critical reception ===
Professional ratings
Review scores
| Source | Rating |
|---|---|
| AllMusic | 3/5 stars |
| Drowned in Sound | 8/10 |
| Ground Control magazine | positive |
| Punknews.org | 4.5/5 stars |
| Sputnikmusic | 3.5/5 |

The Unraveling received positive reviews upon its initial release. Merrill praised the album's music, and described Rise Against as the "hardcore salvation" he had been waiting for. Boy wrote that he was initially skeptical about listening to the album, but ultimately called it "a surprisingly accomplished work that contains all of the band's trademark strengths". He also highlighted the musicianship between the band members. Benwell noted that while the music was not innovative, it was still a "perfectly formed slab of uplifting punk rock", and recommended the album to any hardcore punk fans. AllMusic's Kurt Morris commented that Rise Against was different than other Fat Wreck Chords bands at the time, as there was no poppy songs or juvenile humor in the lyrics. He felt that the music was "pure and unadulterated", and that The Unraveling would revitalize moshing.

The 2005 reissue was also met with positive reviews. AltSounds highlighted the improved sound quality and called it a "must have for any Rise Against fan". Sputnikmusic also noted the improved sound quality, but criticized the positioning of each song in the track list. The reviewer wrote that certain songs felt out of place when paired next to each other, and wondered why the track listing had not been altered for the reissue.

== Track listing ==
All lyrics written by Tim McIlrath; all music composed by Tim McIlrath, Joe Principe, Dan Wleklinski, and Brandon Barnes.

| No. | Title | Length |
|---|---|---|
| 1. | "Alive and Well" | 2:06 |
| 2. | "My Life Inside Your Heart" | 3:02 |
| 3. | "Great Awakening" | 1:35 |
| 4. | "Six Ways 'Til Sunday" | 2:36 |
| 5. | "401 Kill" | 3:19 |
| 6. | "The Art of Losing" | 1:50 |
| 7. | "Remains of Summer Memories" | 1:17 |
| 8. | "The Unraveling" | 3:12 |
| 9. | "Reception Fades" | 2:10 |
| 10. | "Stained Glass and Marble" | 1:36 |
| 11. | "Everchanging" | 3:47 |
| 12. | "Sometimes Selling Out Is Giving Up" | 1:09 |
| 13. | "3 Day Weekend" | 1:03 |
| 14. | "1000 Good Intentions" | 3:07 |
| 15. | "Weight of Time" | 2:00 |
| 16. | "Faint Resemblance" | 2:51 |
| Total length: | | 36:40 |

Bonus tracks on the 2005 reissue
| No. | Title | Length |
|---|---|---|
| 17. | "Join the Ranks" | 1:26 |
| 18. | "Gethsemane" | 2:30 |
| Total length: | | 40:36 |

== Personnel ==
Credits adapted from the liner notes of the 2005 reissue of The Unraveling.

Rise Against

- Tim McIlrath – lead vocals
- Dan Wleklinski (credited as Mr. Precision in the cd booklet) – guitar
- Joe Principe – bass guitar, backing vocals
- Brandon Barnes – drums, percussion

Additional musicians

- Russ Rankin – backing vocals on "Weight of Time"
- Todd Mohney – guitar on "Gethsemane" (2005 reissue)

Production

- Mass Giorgini – producer, engineer
- Fergus Daly – additional engineering
- Dan Lumley – additional engineering
- Dan Wleklinski – additional engineering
- Phillip Hill – additional engineering
- Don Yonker – additional engineering
- Jason Livermore – mixing, mastering (2005 reissue)
- Bill Stevenson – mixing, mastering (2005 reissue)
