= 88 Fingers Louie =

American punk rock band

- Origin: Chicago, Illinois, US
- Genres: Melodic hardcore; punk rock
- Years active: 1993–1996; 1998–1999; 2009–2010; 2013–present
- Labels: Fat Wreck Chords; Hopeless; Rocco; Go Deaf
- Spinoffs: Rise Against
- Members: Denis Buckley; Dan Wleklinski; Nat Wright; John Carroll
- Past members: Dom Vallone; Glenn Porter; John Contreras; Joe Principe

88 Fingers Louie is an American punk rock band from Chicago, Illinois, which was formed in 1993. After disbanding in 1999, guitarist Dan Wleklinski and bassist Joe Principe formed the well-known punk rock band Rise Against. The band reunited in 2009, and has continued playing shows in Chicago, Canada, Belgium, Las Vegas, and Asbury Park. The band held a 20th anniversary show in 2013. The name comes from a Flintstones gangster who sells dodgy pianos.

== History ==
=== Early career ===
88 Fingers Louie was formed in 1993 in Chicago, Illinois, by vocalist Denis Buckley, guitarist Mr. Precision (Dan Wleklinski), bassist Joe Principe and drummer Dom Vallone. The same year the band released their first 7-inch on their own "Go Deaf Records", and after signing to Fat Wreck Chords the band released two more 7-inch EPs, "Go Away" and "Wanted".

After appearing on several split and compilation albums in 1994, the band released their next 10-inch EP, "Totin' 40's and Fuckin' Shit Up" in 1995 and shortly after, drummer Dom Vallone left the band. The band was joined by new drummer Glenn Porter, followed by the release of their first full album Behind Bars on Hopeless Records on September 12, 1995, which was well received.

=== Internal struggles ===
The band started touring more and tension between band members started building up. After appearing on the Chicago vs. Amsterdam split EP, 88 Fingers Louie disbanded in late 1996 due to fights between band members, and vocalist Denis Buckley allegedly having urinated on drummer Glenn Porter. However, shortly before disbanding, the band had recorded a new 7-inch single, "The Teacher Gets it", which was released in early 1997. Later the same year, Fat Wreck Chords released a compilation album of all the band's 7-inch releases on the label titled The Dom Years.

However, in 1998 the band decided to start things up again, this time with new, and current drummer, John Carroll. The band released its second album, Back on the Streets, and went back on tour. Things seemed well, but internal fights once again tore the band apart. Only weeks after releasing a split album with Kid Dynamite, the band disbanded due to vocalist Denis Buckley and bassist Joe Principe getting into a fight.

Buckley went on to sing in the melodic hardcore band Explode and Make Up, previous drummer Glenn Porter started playing for Alkaline Trio after leaving 88 Fingers Louie, last drummer John Carroll went on to drum for Paper Mice, while Dan Wleklinski and Joe Principe formed the band Rise Against.

== Reunion and Live CD and DVD ==
On August 14 and 15, 2009, the band performed 2 sold out reunion shows. The first one was hosted by Riot Fest, while the second was at Chicago's Bottom Lounge. The lineup featured founding members Mr. Precision (Dan Wleklinski), Denis "The Grandpa" Buckley, and John Carroll. Bassist Joe Principe was asked to join, but was unable due to commitments with Rise Against, so the band added new bassist John Contreras. Previous drummer Glenn Porter also played 5 songs during the reunion show.
The album titled 88 Fingers Louie LIVES is a 78-Minute 26-Track Live CD from Chicago’s Bottom Lounge recorded 8-15-2009 and mixed by Dan Wleklinski at his Bombshelter Recording Studio. In 2010, a DVD of the show was also released. Later that year The band continued to tour and played at several shows and festivals from 2009 on, including an Eastern Canadian tour, Groezrock Festival in Belgium, and Amnesia Rockfest in Canada.
In 2013, Nat Wright, from Chicago's Shot Baker, joined 88 Fingers Louie as their newest bass player. In 2013, the last pre-reunion lineup of the band, featuring Joe Principe on bass, held a 20th anniversary show. In 2015, 88 had two back-to-back shows at Reggie's Rock Club in Chicago, and is scheduled to play Pouzza Fest and Punk Rock Bowling.
In 2016 the band embarked on a few small tours, first one in Florida, then the west coast.
In 2017 the band released their first new album in 19 years titled "Thank you for being a Friend". It was released June 30 by Bird Attack Records out of Jacksonville Beach, FL and followed by a tour in Europe.

== Band members ==
Current lineup

- Denis Buckley – lead vocals (1993–1996, 1998–1999, 2009–2010, 2013–present)
- Dan "Mr. Precision" Wleklinski – guitar, vocals (1993–1996, 1998–1999, 2009–2010, 2013–present)
- John Carroll – drums, backing vocals (1998–1999, 2009–2010, 2013–present)
- Nat Wright – bass guitar (2013–present)

Former members

- Joe Principe – bass guitar, backing vocals (1993–1996, 1998–1999)
- Dominic "Dom" Vallone – drums (1993–1995)
- Glenn Porter – drums, backing vocals (1995–1996)
- John Contreras – bass guitar (2009–2010)

== Discography ==
=== Studio albums ===
- Behind Bars (1995)
- Back on the Streets (1998)
- Thank You for Being a Friend (2017)

=== EPs, splits, and compilations ===
- Happy Anniversary 7" (1993)
- Go Away 7" (1993)
- Wanted 7" (1993)
- Totin' 40's & Fuckin' Shit Up 10" (1995)
- Chicago vs. Amsterdam 7" (1996)
- The Dom Years (1997)
- 88 Fingers Up Your Ass (1997)
- The Teacher Gets It 7" (1997)
- 88 Fingers Louie/Kid Dynamite (1999)
- 88 Fingers Louie LIVES (2009)
- 88 Fingers Louie Lives DVD (2010)
- Get Off My Lawn 7" (2017)

== Music videos ==
- I've Won (1999)
