= Nowhere Generation =

Studio album by Rise Against
- Released: June 4, 2021
- Studio: The Blasting Room (Fort Collins, Colorado)
- Genre: Punk rock; melodic hardcore
- Length: 41:36
- Label: Loma Vista
- Producer: Bill Stevenson; Jason Livermore; Andrew Berlin; Chris Beeble

Rise Against chronology
The Ghost Note Symphonies, Vol. 1 (2018)	Nowhere Generation (2021)	Nowhere Sessions – EP (2021)

Rise Against studio album chronology
Wolves (2017)	Nowhere Generation (2021)	Ricochet (2025)

Singles from Nowhere Generation
- 1. "Broken Dreams, Inc" Released: September 16, 2020; 2. "Nowhere Generation" Released: March 18, 2021; 3. "The Numbers" Released: May 6, 2021; 4. "Talking to Ourselves" Released: June 1, 2021

Nowhere Generation is the ninth studio album by American punk rock band Rise Against, released on June 4, 2021, on Loma Vista Recordings. It is the band's first album in four years, serving as the follow-up to 2017's Wolves. Four singles were released for the album: "Broken Dreams, Inc", "Nowhere Generation", "The Numbers", and "Talking to Ourselves". The album was produced by Bill Stevenson, Jason Livermore, Andrew Berlin, and Chris Beeble. The album's single of the same name was released on March 18, 2021, and the album was announced that day.

== Background and production ==
After the completion of the touring cycle for 2017's Wolves and the release of their acoustic album The Ghost Note Symphonies, Vol. 1, frontman Tim McIlrath revealed in a May 2019 interview with Kerrang! that the band was writing new music, but that they would be employing a more relaxed approach to the writing process. "Yes, we are writing," McIlrath stated in the interview. "We're getting together and playing ideas, but I wouldn't hold your breath. The one thing that we have decided is that we don't want to feel rushed, we'll put out the record when it's done, not to try and meet some deadline." This was further reinforced in a July 2020 interview with Danny Wimmer Presents with McIlrath confirming (in relation to the ongoing COVID-19 pandemic) that the band was "not going anywhere," and further clarifying "we have new music, we have it all – this isn't the end, this is just a new beginning." By the end of the recording sessions for Nowhere Generation, the band had recorded sixteen songs, but five of them were ultimately used for the band's 2022 EP, Nowhere Generation II, so as to not have too many songs on the album.

Following the album's announcement in March 2021, the band outlined the themes and messaging behind the record in a press release, stating that "today there is the promise of the American Dream, and then there is the reality of the American Dream. America's 'historical norm' that the next generation will be better off than the one that came before has been diminished by an era of mass social, economic and political instability and a sell-out of the middle class. The brass ring that was promised by hard work and dedication no longer exists for everyone. When the privileged climb the ladder of success and then burn it from the top, disruption becomes the only answer."

Nowhere Generation saw the band once again working with long-time producers Bill Stevenson and Jason Livermore at the Blasting Room, with bassist Joe Principe referring to Stevenson as their "not-so-secret weapon", who had "helped shape the band; he gets what we want to do and will go with us when we think outside the box. He's the perfect producer for the style of music we play because he has an insane pop sensibility and the hardcore side to him as well." In addition to Stevenson and Livermore, the album also saw the band work with fellow Blasting Room producers Andrew Berlin and Chris Beeble.

== Release and promotion ==
On February 23, 2021, the band began posting cryptic videos across their social media accounts encouraging their audience to head over to their website, which had been updated with a new aesthetic. They continued to post up until March 18, 2021, when they announced the new album with a June 4 release date, alongside the eponymous lead single and its music video. It was also confirmed that "Broken Dreams, Inc", a track originally released as part of the Dark Nights: Death Metal soundtrack on September 16, 2020, would also feature on the album. Tim McIlrath discussed the band's inclusion on the soundtrack with Wall of Sound comparing his songwriting to that of the comic's storytelling publishers and authors. The album was supported by a further two singles prior to release; "The Numbers" and "Talking to Ourselves", which were released on May 6, 2021, and June 1, 2021, respectively.

The album and its physical releases feature artwork and design created in collaboration with Brian Roettinger, a Grammy-nominated creative director.

Nowhere Generation was released on June 4, 2021. In support of the album, the band embarked on a US tour that summer with the Descendents and The Menzingers opening for them. The band also went on additional tours in 2022 with Billy Talent, The Used, Senses Fail, Pennywise, and Stick To Your Guns.

== Critical reception ==
Nowhere Generation received generally positive reviews upon release, with Metacritic awarding the album an aggregated score of 74 out of 100 based on 6 reviews, 5 of which were positive.

Wall of Sound scored the album 9/10, stating that the band's "goal of riling people up, and making them realise the inequality of the world in which we live in, has been achieved".

Paul Travers of Kerrang! would rate the record 4/5, praising the band's consistency stating, "There's still a lot that will be familiar to longtime fans, but the most impressive thing is how passionate Rise Against remain. Twenty years in, and their revolutionary fire is still as relevant and as sadly needed as ever."

It was elected by Loudwire as the 42nd best rock/metal album of 2021.

Professional ratings
Aggregate scores
Source	Rating
Metacritic	74/100
Review scores
Source	Rating
AllMusic	3.5/5 stars
Kerrang!	4/5 stars
Punktuationmag	5/5 stars

== Commercial performance ==
Nowhere Generation was the first Rise Against album to not debut in the top 10 of the Billboard 200 since Siren Song of the Counter Culture.

== Track listing ==
Nowhere Generation track listing
No.	Title	Length
1.	"The Numbers"	4:59
2.	"Sudden Urge"	3:46
3.	"Nowhere Generation"	3:52
4.	"Talking to Ourselves"	3:24
5.	"Broken Dreams, Inc"	3:53
6.	"Forfeit"	3:44
7.	"Monarch"	3:32
8.	"Sounds Like"	3:25
9.	"Sooner or Later"	3:34
10.	"Middle of a Dream"	3:44
11.	"Rules of Play"	3:43
Total length:		41:36

== Personnel ==
Credits adapted from AllMusic.

Rise Against

- Tim McIlrath – lead vocals, rhythm guitar
- Zach Blair – lead guitar, backing vocals
- Joe Principe – bass guitar, backing vocals
- Brandon Barnes – drums, percussion

Production

- Bill Stevenson – production, engineer,
- Jason Livermore – production, engineer, mixing
- Andrew Berlin – production, engineer
- Chris Beeble – production, engineer
- Ted Jensen – mastering

Additional personnel

- Christian Gomez – A&R
- Mary Hogan – A&R
- Brian Roettinger – creative direction
- Ryan Whalley – A&R
- Tom Whalley – A&R

Additional musicians

- Chad Price – backing vocals
- Chris Beeble – Fender Rhodes, organ, backing vocals (track 3)
- Adrienne Ash, Andrew Berlin, Gabriel Brady, Chantel Flowers, Sam Kanter, Alexa Lenort, Jonathan Luginbill, Bill Stevenson, Madeline Stevenson, Miles Stevenson, and Stacie Stevenson – backing vocals (track 3)
- TJ Wessel – violin (track 6)
- John Paul Grigsby – upright bass (track 6)

== Charts ==
Chart performance for Nowhere Generation
Chart (2021)	Peak position
Australian Albums (ARIA)	4
Austrian Albums (Ö3 Austria)	3
Belgian Albums (Ultratop Flanders)	36
Belgian Albums (Ultratop Wallonia)	184
Canadian Albums (Billboard)	30
German Albums (Offizielle Top 100)	2
Scottish Albums (OCC)	10
Swiss Albums (Schweizer Hitparade)	4
UK Albums (OCC)	19
UK Rock & Metal Albums (OCC)	2
US Billboard 200	39
US Top Alternative Albums (Billboard)	4
US Top Hard Rock Albums (Billboard)	2
US Top Rock Albums (Billboard)	4
