= Joe Principe =

American bassist (born 1974)

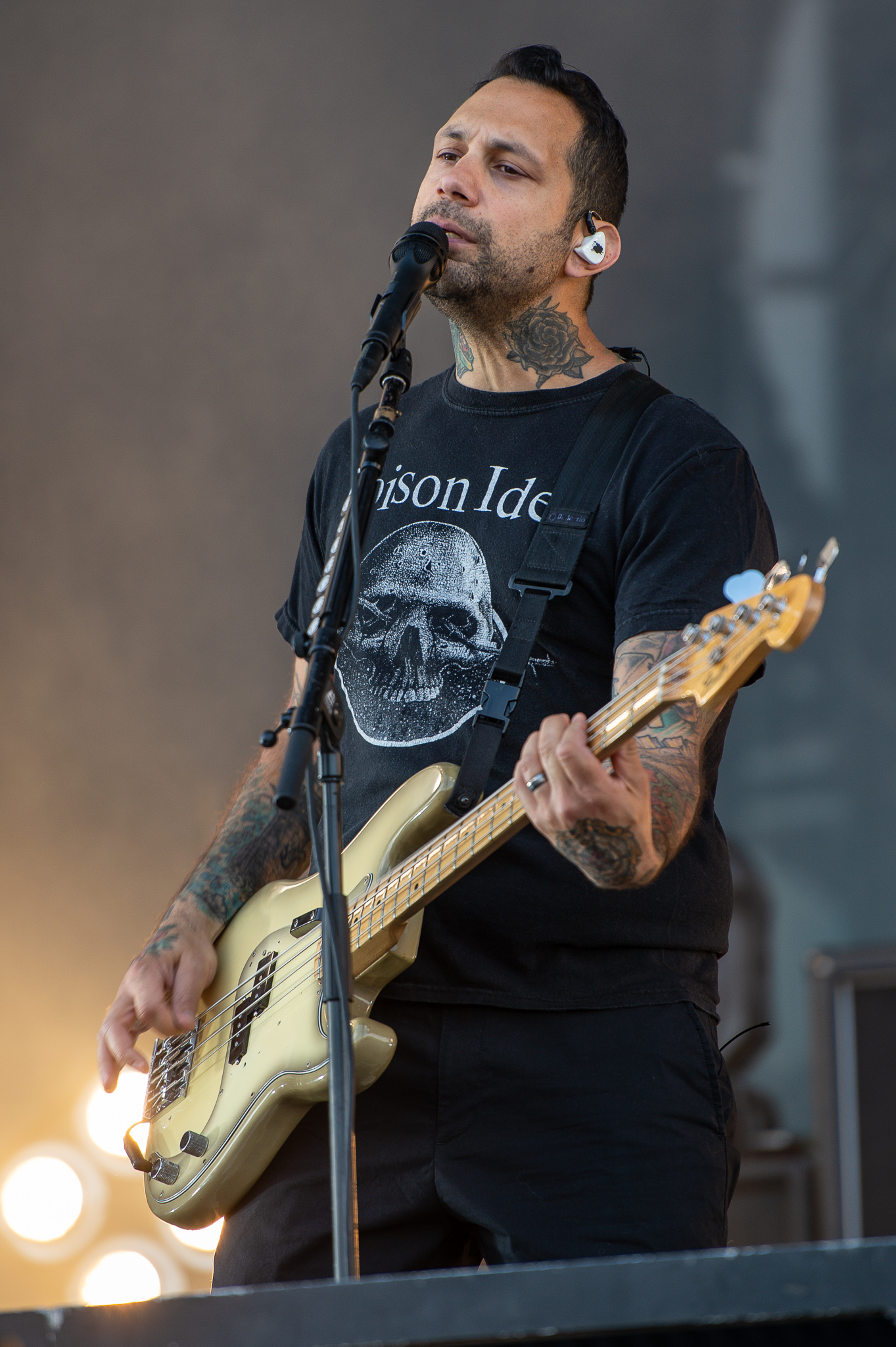
- Principe at Rock im Park 2019

Background information
- Born: November 14, 1974 (age 51); Melrose Park, Illinois, U.S.
- Genres: Melodic hardcore; punk rock; hardcore punk
- Occupation: Bassist
- Years active: 1993–present

Joseph Daniel Principe (/ˈprɪnsɪpeɪ/; born November 14, 1974) is an American musician. He is the bassist, backing vocalist, and co-founder of the punk rock band Rise Against.

He is also straight edge, a vegan, an animal rights advocate, and actively promotes PETA with his band.

== Early life ==
Principe began his musical career at age 15, learning to play by ear and influenced during his formative years by Bad Religion, Minor Threat, Bad Brains, the Descendents, Bill Swerski and other like minded bands. Principe attended Holy Cross High School in River Grove, Illinois.

== Career ==
=== 88 Fingers Louie (1993–1999) ===
In 1993, Principe formed the Chicago punk band 88 Fingers Louie with Dom Vallone, Mr. Precision, and Denis Buckley. The band were together for six years of touring and releasing records (Go Away, Wanted, Totin' 40's & Fuckin' Shit Up, Behind Bars, 88 Fingers Up Your Ass, The Dom Years, The Teacher Gets It, Back On The Streets, 88 Fingers Louie/Kid Dynamite). In 1999, tensions formed within the band, and the members decided to break up and go their separate ways.

=== Rise Against (1999–present) ===
Shortly after the breakup of 88 Fingers Louie, Principe formed a new band with the guitarist and drummer from 88 Fingers Louie. They went straight into the studio to demo 7 songs and began searching for a singer. Joe visited friends and fellow musicians Sick of It All and AFI at a show in Indianapolis and ran into Chicago friend Tim McIlrath of the band Baxter. Joe always liked the grit of Tim’s voice and asked him to try out. Despite friends' skepticism about the stylistic differences, the pairing worked. Those 7 songs made it onto The Unraveling. They later met up with drummer Toni Tintari and formed the band as "Transistor Revolt," the band's original name before changing it to "Rise Against".

In 2000, they released the self-titled demo, Transistor Revolt. Tintari left the band in the fall of that year before the recording of their full-length album. He was later replaced by Brandon Barnes of "Pinhead Circus". The band then signed with independent record label Fat Wreck Chords in 2001. They then released their debut album The Unraveling and spent the rest of the year touring. In 2002, Mr. Precision left and was replaced by Todd Mohney. The band returned to the studio in December 2002 to work on their second full-length album, Revolutions per Minute in 2003 and toured for the 2003 Warped Tour, which gained the band some success. Rise Against then signed to DreamWorks Records in late 2003 to begin the recording of their third record, but Dreamworks was shortly absorbed by the Universal Music Group, and Rise Against found itself with Major label Geffen Records. Todd Mohney, the band's guitarist at the time, left and was replaced by Chris Chasse and began the recording of their new album Siren Song of the Counter Culture. Siren Song of the Counter Culture was released on August 10, 2004, peaking at number 136 on the Billboard 200 album charts, gaining the band major critical and commercial success with the singles "Give It All, "Swing Life Away", and "Life Less Frightening".

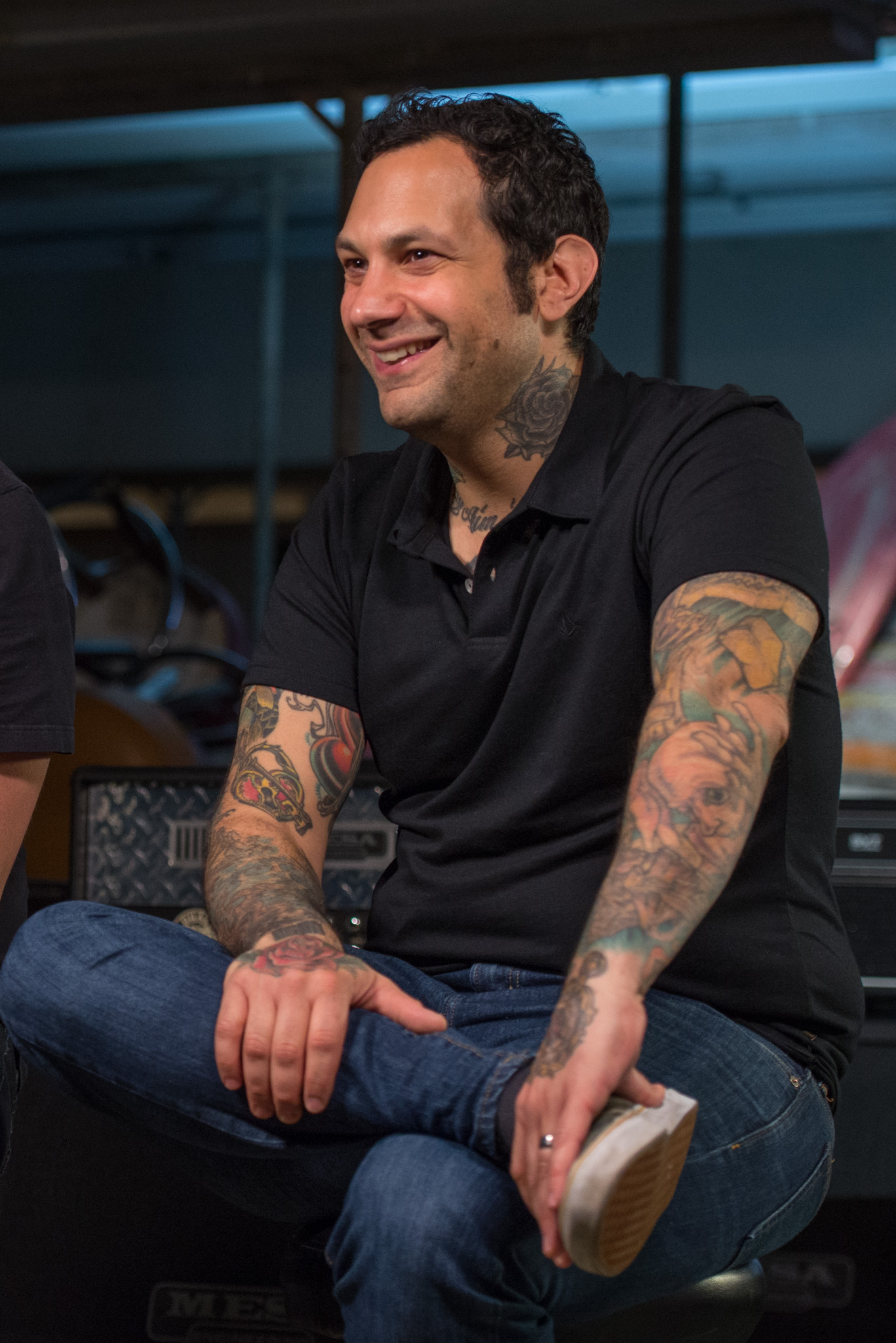
Principe in 2015

The band re-entered the studio in January 2006, after touring in support of Siren Song of the Counter Culture, and recorded their fourth studio album at the Blasting Room studio in Fort Collins, Colorado with producers Bill Stevenson and Jason Livermore. The Sufferer & the Witness was released on July 4, 2006, peaking at number 10 on the Billboard 200 and received generally positive reviews from critics and was a commercial success along with their singles "Ready to Fall", "Prayer of the Refugee" and "The Good Left Undone". Rise Against toured in support of The Sufferer & the Witness throughout the second half of 2006 and all of 2007. The band was a headliner in the 2006 Warped Tour as part of The Sufferer & the Witness Tour. In late 2006, the band co-headlined a tour with Thursday that included the bands Circa Survive and Billy Talent. The Sufferer & the Witness has less of the hardcore punk feel from the band's previous albums. In 2007, Chasse decided to leave the band and was replaced by longtime friend Zach Blair from Only Crime. During this tour, on July 3, 2007, Rise Against released an EP in Canada titled This Is Noise, which was subsequently released in the United States on January 15, 2008.

Rise Against's fifth studio album, Appeal to Reason, was released in October through DGC/Interscope. The album sold 64,700 copies in its first week and peaked at number 3 on the Billboard 200, making it Rise Against's highest-charting album to date at the time. Appeal to Reason was met with generally positive reviews, with its singles Re-Education (Through Labor), Audience of One, and Savior. Rise Against embarked on a North American tour with bands Rancid, Billy Talent, Killswitch Engage, and Riverboat Gamblers in June and July 2009.

After touring for almost two years, Rise Against had begun recording their sixth studio album for a 2011 release, at the Blasting Room in Fort Collins, Colorado. Rise Against announced two South American shows in Brazil and Argentina and a run of European shows in late February and March 2011, respectively. Endgame was released on March 11, 2011, in the United States peaking at number 2 on The Billboard 200, receiving positive reviews from critics and commercial success. Rise Against have since earned several gold and platinum records in the United States and Canada throughout their career.

== Personal life ==
Joe Principe currently resides in suburban Chicago (Downers Grove) with his wife, Elena and their three children; Micah, Zoe, and Nico. Principe was a vegetarian for many years and, inspired by his wife, he made the transition to veganism in 2017.

== Musical equipment ==
Joe has primarily used Fender basses and Ampeg amplifiers throughout his career. He used a Fender Jazz Bass for the recording of The Unraveling, a G&L JB-2 for the recording of Revolutions Per Minute and the Heaven Knows music video, a Geddy Lee Signature Fender Jazz Bass for the recording of Siren Song of the Counter Culture and has used varieties of the Fender Precision Bass for the following albums, tours and music videos. As well as Ampeg amplifiers, Joe has used a Fender Super Bassman 300 watt head with 8x10 cabinets and has recently started using Orange amplifiers, using the Orange AD200 head with 2 8x10 cabinets. He also owns an Orange Terror Bass 1000 head.

Joe has used the following equipment:

- Fender American Vintage '57 Precision Bass (Vintage White, used for The Sufferer & the Witness tour and the Prayer of the Refugee music video)
- Fender American Vintage '62 Precision Bass (Sunburst, used for The Sufferer & the Witness tour)
- Fender Road Worn 50's Precision Bass (Fiesta Red, used for the Appeal to Reason tour)
- Fender Road Worn 50's Precision Bass (Sunburst, used for the Appeal to Reason tour)
- Fender Precision Bass (Antigua, used for the Appeal to Reason tour)
- Fender American Vintage '62 Precision Bass (Black, used in the Re-Education (Through Labor) music video)
- Fender American Standard Precision Bass (Olympic White)
- Fender American Standard Precision Bass (Natural)
- Fender American Special Precision Bass (Seafoam Green. Custom made by Fender. Later given away as part of a competition in 2010)
- Fender Precision Bass (Brown)
- Fender Tony Franklin Fretted Precision Bass (Olympic White, used for the recording of Endgame)
- Fender Geddy Lee Jazz Bass (Black, used for the recording of Siren Song of Counter Culture and the subsequent tour)
- Fender American Standard Jazz Bass (Black)
- Fender Roger Waters Precision Bass (Black)
- G&L JB-2 Bass (Natural, used for the recording of Revolutions Per Minute and the Heaven Knows music video)
- Fender Jazz Bass (Natural, used for the recording of The Unraveling)
- Joe Principe Signature Specimen Aluminum Bass Guitar (used in rehearsals)
- Fender Steve Harris Precision Bass (Royal Blue Metallic)
- Fender Precision Bass (Brown)
- Josh Parkin Guitars Classic-P Bass (Precision Bass copy, Black)
- Fender Standard Precision Bass (Arctic White)
- Fender 60th Anniversary Precision Bass (Blonde)
- Fender Precision Bass (White with white pickup cover)
- TECH 21 Sansamp Bass Driver DI
- Ampeg Heritage SVT-CL head and Ampeg Heritage SVT-810E cabinet (used for the recording of Endgame)
- Ampeg V4-B head and 2 Ampeg SVT-212AV cabinets (used for the recording of The Black Market)
- Fender Super Bassman head with Fender Bassman 810 Neo cabinet
- Orange AD200 head with 2 8x10 cabinets (used for The Black Market tour)
- Ernie Ball Regular Slinky strings
- Dunlop Nylon .88mm picks
- EBow. Used when recording Sufferer & the Witness
- Seymour Duncan SPB-3 Quarter Pounder pickups (fitted to the majority of his Precision basses)
- Leo Quan BadAss II Bridge

== Discography ==
With Rise Against

- Transistor Revolt (2000)
- The Unraveling (2001)
- Revolutions per Minute (2003)
- Siren Song of the Counter Culture (2004)
- The Sufferer & the Witness (2006)
- This Is Noise (2007)
- Appeal to Reason (2008)
- Endgame (2011)
- The Black Market (2014)
- Wolves (2017)
- Nowhere Generation (2021)
- Nowhere Generation II (2022)
- Ricochet (2025)

With 88 Fingers Louie

- Go Away 7"(1993)
- Wanted 7" (1993)
- Totin' 40's & Fuckin' Shit Up (1995)
- Behind Bars (1995)
- 88 Fingers Up Your Ass (1997)
- The Dom Years (1997)
- The Teacher Gets It (1997)
- Back On The Streets (1998)
- 88 Fingers Louie/Kid Dynamite (1999)

With Dead Ending

- Dead Ending (2012)
- Dead Ending II (2012)
- Dead Ending III (2014)
- Shoot the Messenger (2017)
