= Revolutions per Minute (Rise Against album) =

Studio album by Rise Against
- Released: April 8, 2003
- Recorded: November–December 2002
- Studio: The Blasting Room (Fort Collins, Colorado)
- Genre: Melodic hardcore
- Length: 37:42
- Label: Fat Wreck Chords
- Producer: Bill Stevenson; Jason Livermore

Rise Against chronology
The Unraveling (2001)	Revolutions per Minute (2003)	Siren Song of the Counter Culture (2004)

Revolutions per Minute is the second studio album by American punk rock band Rise Against, released on April 8, 2003, by Fat Wreck Chords. After establishing a fanbase with their 2001 debut, The Unraveling, the band members wanted to record an album that distinguished them from other Fat Wreck Chords bands of the time. They chose Bill Stevenson and Jason Livermore to produce the album, with whom they developed a strong rapport. Recording took place from November to December 2002 at The Blasting Room in Fort Collins, Colorado. It is the band's only album to feature lead guitarist Todd Mohney.

Musically, Revolutions per Minute is rooted in melodic hardcore. Critics noted that the album exhibited greater musical maturity and an overall darker tone when compared to its predecessor. It comprises thirteen songs, with lyrical themes ranging from relationships and politics. To promote the album, Rise Against toured extensively with other Fat Wreck Chords bands, and participated in the 2003 Warped Tour.

Upon its release, the album peaked at number 35 on the Independent Albums chart, and was praised for its impassioned lyrics and unique blend of genres. Some critics called it one of the best albums of the year. According to Bryne Yancey of Punknews.org, Revolutions per Minute not only popularized the melodic hardcore genre, but also influenced "literally thousands of bands" with its music and social commentary. The album also introduced several aspects that would become common traits in Rise Against's newer material, such as extensive social commentary, and reliance on musical accessibility. In 2013, Fat Wreck Chords re-released the album with ten bonus demos and expanded packaging.

== Background and recording ==
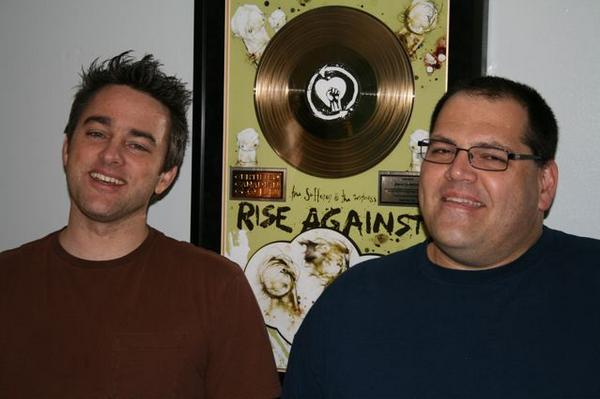
Jason Livermore (left) and Bill Stevenson (right) produced Revolutions per Minute at The Blasting Room.

In April 2001, Rise Against released its debut studio album The Unraveling through Fat Wreck Chords. Although the album failed to reach any major music charts, it did receive positive reviews from critics, and helped establish a steady fanbase for the band. After the release of The Unraveling, guitarist Dan Wleklinski left the band due to personal differences with lead vocalist Tim McIlrath; he was eventually replaced by Todd Mohney, McIlrath's roommate and former bandmate.

When it came time to record Rise Against's second album, Revolutions per Minute, McIlrath noted that the band was suffering from an "identity crisis". At the time, Fat Wreck Chords had a specific pop punk sound, so the band members wanted to find a producer who could help distinguish them from the other bands on the label, and highlight the heavier aspects of their music. Sonic Iguana Studios, where Rise Against recorded The Unraveling, and another studio in San Francisco were both busy at the time, leaving the band members only thirty days to record. They decided on Bill Stevenson—the former drummer of the punk band Descendents—and Jason Livermore to produce the album.

Before the recording process began, the band members wrote songs for the album above an antique store in Chicago, an environment that McIlrath described as "roach-infested". Revolutions per Minute was recorded at The Blasting Room in Fort Collins, Colorado, from November to December 2002. Stevenson and Livermore produced the album; Stevenson also served as the engineer and mixer, while Livermore mastered the album. McIlrath commented that Stevenson was the perfect person to produce the album, as he not only understood the nuances of the band, but was also their "musical soul mate". Revolutions per Minute was the first album that McIlrath played guitar on. He was nervous about playing the guitar, as no one had ever scrutinized his ability, and described the process as "playing blindly into the wind and hoping it was good enough".

== Composition ==
"Dead Ringer"
"Dead Ringer" is one of the two short hardcore songs on the album. Its lyrics chastise those who discredit the band for selling out.

"Like the Angel"
"Like the Angel" begins with strumming of the bass guitar, which leads into a conventional song structure with a "poppy" beat.

Musically, Revolutions per Minute is rooted in melodic hardcore. Stuart Green of Exclaim! opined that the album exhibited greater musical maturity when compared to The Unraveling, specifically for the inclusion of mood and texture. These comments were echoed by Punknews.org's Aubin Paul, who noted the album's overall "darker" tone.

The first track on Revolutions per Minute is "Black Masks & Gasoline", which features "power chords" and rapid drumming. Its lyrics advocate for a revolution against a vengeful government, and contain imagery of raised hands and clenched fists. The second track, "Heaven Knows", makes use of "serrated, slingshot hooks", with lyrics that deal with "personal strife". The next track, "Dead Ringer", is a short hardcore song that chastises those who felt that the band had sold out due to their growing popularity. Jo-Ann Greene of AllMusic believes that "Halfway There" is about the need for a real leader and questioning the current leaders' action, bolstered by McIlrath's screaming vocals.

The fifth track, "Like the Angel", begins with strumming of the bass guitar, before transitioning into a "poppy" beat about unrequited love. "Voices Off Camera:" is one of the more accessible songs on the album, with McIlrath singing in a softer voice. In contrast, "Blood-Red, White, & Blue" is described by Matthew Fiander of PopMatters as a "musical tour de force", with a moody breakdown. With it, McIlrath wanted to write a song that showcased the conflict of interests following the September 11 attacks, between overt patriotism, and war crimes in the name of God. The eighth track, "Broken English", "switches tempo constantly", and has motivational lyrics in the chorus. McIlrath describes "Last Chance Blueprint" as the band's "escape song", while Fiander feels it is a "stock get-out-of-town tune". It contains a soundbite from the 1999 film American Beauty.

"To the Core" is another short hardcore song that Greene describes as "a ferocious, fever-pitched number written and delivered with pure vitriol". McIlarth notes that "Torches" is a very different when compared to most of the band's material, due to its heavy metal-influenced intro and breakdown. The penultimate track, "Amber Changing", is more muted in its sound, and has McIlrath sing about not wanting a great moment in a relationship to end. The album ends with a hidden track, a cover of "Any Way You Want It" by Journey. The band covered the song to bring a sense of familiarity to listeners while on tour.

== Release and reception ==
Professional ratings
Review scores
Source	Rating
AllMusic	4.5/5 stars
Sputnikmusic	3.5/5

Fat Wreck Chords released Revolutions per Minute on April 8, 2003, in the United States on CD and LP formats. Like The Unraveling, it failed to reach any major music chart, but did reach number thirty-five on the Independent Albums chart. Promotion for the album included North American and Japan based tours with other Fat Wreck Chord bands like Anti-Flag, None More Black, and No Use for a Name, and several performances in the 2003 Warped Tour in North America. Additionally, "Like the Angel" was released as a promotional single.

Revolutions per Minute was well received by music critics. Paul praised the album for its honest and personal lyrics, as well as its unique blend of hardcore punk and melodic hardcore. He concluded by declaring it one of the best albums of the year, a sentiment which was shared by The Virginian-Pilot's Jeff Maisey. Greene liked the juxtaposition of impassioned and political lyrics, commenting that the album is capable of "rubbing emotions raw and minds numb". Davey Boy of Sputnikmusic felt that with Revolutions per Minute, Rise Against took their craft and musicianship more seriously. He commented that while the songs themselves do not work well individually, "the band should be given credit for how even and consistent the album still is, and for the fact that it is a solid and cohesive listen."

=== Impact and re-release ===
Bryne Yancey of Punknews.org notes that in the early 2000s, melodic hardcore was not a well established genre. With the release of Revolutions per Minute, Yancey argues Rise Against not only popularized the genre, but also influenced "literally thousands of bands residing somewhere within the melodic hardcore spectrum" with the album's music and social commentary. Revolutions per Minute was also an important album for Rise Against, as Boy believes it "clearly played a huge role in shaping what was to come" for the band. It was their first album to make extensive use of social and political commentary, which has become a staple for Rise Against material. Some songs like "Voices Off Camera:" and "Broken English" demonstrated a greater reliance on musical accessibility, which "hinted" at the band's eventual shift toward mainstream rock.

To commemorate the tenth anniversary of Revolutions per Minute, Fat Wreck Chords re-released the album as RPM10 on May 28, 2013. The re-release features ten bonus demo tracks and expanded packaging, but omits the cover of "Any Way You Want It" from the original release. Yancey felt that album held up surprisingly well, and that while the demos were interesting, they were unessential. In contrast, Fiander did not think that the lyrical content had aged well, and that the demos were only "slightly more ragged versions of the album cuts".

== Track listing ==
All lyrics written by Tim McIlrath; all music composed by Tim McIlrath, Joe Principe, Todd Mohney, and Brandon Barnes, except where noted.

No.	Title	Writer(s)	Length
1.	"Black Masks & Gasoline"		2:59
2.	"Heaven Knows"		3:23
3.	"Dead Ringer"		1:31
4.	"Halfway There"		3:41
5.	"Like the Angel"		2:46
6.	"Voices Off Camera:"		2:17
7.	"Blood-Red, White, & Blue"		3:38
8.	"Broken English"		3:25
9.	"Last Chance Blueprint"		2:14
10.	"To the Core"		1:33
11.	"Torches"		3:41
12.	"Amber Changing" (ends at 2:54; 45 seconds of silence at end of track)		3:39
13.	"Any Way You Want It" (hidden track)	Steve Perry; Neal Schon	2:57
Total length:			37:42

RPM10 bonus tracks
No.	Title	Length
14.	"Black Masks & Gasoline (Demo)"	2:55
15.	"Heaven Knows (Demo)"	3:21
16.	"Halfway There (Demo)"	3:41
17.	"Like the Angel (Demo)"	2:50
18.	"Voices Off Camera: (Demo)"	2:16
19.	"Blood-Red, White, & Blue (Demo)"	3:38
20.	"Broken English (Demo)"	3:27
21.	"Last Chance Blueprint (Demo)"	2:13
22.	"Torches (Demo)"	3:41
23.	"Amber Changing (Demo)"	2:53
Total length:		66:30

== Personnel ==
Credits adapted from the liner notes of Revolutions per Minute.

Rise Against

- Tim McIlrath – lead vocals, rhythm guitar
- Todd Mohney – lead guitar, backing vocals
- Joe Principe – bass guitar, backing vocals
- Brandon Barnes – drums

Additional musicians

- Chad Price – additional backing vocals

Production

- Bill Stevenson – producer, engineer, mixing
- Jason Livermore – producer, mastering

Artwork

- Michael Joseph Jackson – cover art and layout
- Steven Karl Metzer – band photo

== Charts ==
Chart (2003)	Peak position
US Independent Albums (Billboard)	35
