= Nowhere Generation II =

EP by Rise Against
- Released: June 10, 2022
- Genre: Punk rock
- Length: 19:11
- Label: Loma Vista
- Producer: Bill Stevenson; Jason Livermore; Andrew Berlin; Chris Beeble

Rise Against chronology
Nowhere Sessions – EP (2021)	Nowhere Generation II (2022)

Singles from Nowhere Generation II
- 1. "Last Man Standing" Released: June 6, 2022

Nowhere Generation II is the eleventh extended play by American punk rock band Rise Against. It was released as a continuation to their ninth studio album, Nowhere Generation, on June 10, 2022; just over a year after the release of Nowhere Generation. The EP was produced by the band's longtime producers, Bill Stevenson and Jason Livermore, with the addition of Andrew Berlin and Chris Beeble. It was promoted by the single "Last Man Standing".

== Background ==
Recording for Nowhere Generation began in May 2019, but the band had chosen to take a more relaxed approach to the songwriting, which ultimately took much longer. Combined with the COVID-19 pandemic, this ultimately resulted in recording wrapping in mid 2020. Many of the themes addressed in this songwriting focused on how the younger generations navigates the world that has been given to them. Upon completion, the band had sixteen songs for Nowhere Generation, but ultimately chose to break these songs apart into two separate releases. In a press statement, the band's frontman, Tim McIlrath, explained that this was done in order to keep the music and messages from being lost:

"I think this is, hopefully, a more effective way to give these issues the platform and the spotlight that they rightly deserve. We wanted to hold onto these and give them to our fans when we feel like they’ve had time to properly digest this first batch, so these songs were the aces up our sleeves." - Tim Mcllrath

== Release ==
The album, Nowhere Generation, released on June 4, 2021, but Nowhere Generation II was held back from release for just over a year. During that time, the band went on tour in support of the album, and also released the EP, Nowhere Sessions: a collection of live recordings of select songs from the album and two covers. On June 6, 2022, the band released the single "Last Man Standing", as well as revealing the EP by offering preorders of it. The EP officially released alongside a music video for "Last Man Standing" on June 10, 2022.

== Track listing ==
All tracks written by Tim Mcllrath, Joe Principe, Brandon Barnes, and Zach Blair, except where noted.

Nowhere Generation II track listing
No.	Title	Writer(s)	Length
1.	"The Answer"	Mcllrath; Principe; Barnes	4:01
2.	"Last Man Standing"		4:28
3.	"This Time It's Personal"		4:00
4.	"Pain Mgmt"		3:42
5.	"Holding Patterns"		3:30
Total length:			19:41

== Personnel ==
Rise Against

- Tim McIlrath – lead vocals, rhythm guitar
- Zach Blair – lead guitar, backing vocals
- Joe Principe – bass guitar, backing vocals
- Brandon Barnes – drums, percussion

Production

- Bill Stevenson – production, engineer
- Jason Livermore – production, engineer, mixing
- Andrew Berlin – production, engineer
- Chris Beeble – production, engineer
- Ted Jensen – mastering
- Jonathan Luginbill – engineer

Additional musicians

- Chad Price – backing vocals
