= List of songs recorded by Rise Against =

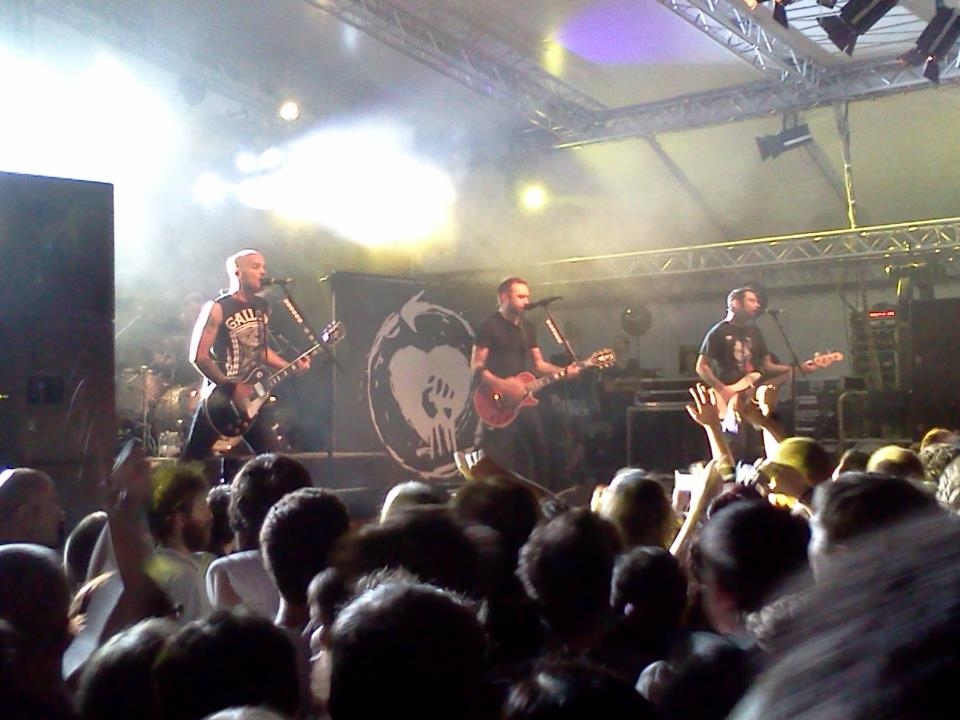
Rise Against performing in 2012

American punk rock band Rise Against has recorded 142 songs, which include 129 original songs and 13 covers. Rise Against was formed in 1999, and signed a recording contract with the independent record label Fat Wreck Chords the following year. Under this label, they released The Unraveling (2001) and Revolutions per Minute (2003), which helped to establish an early fanbase. Afterwards, the band signed with Geffen Records, (Note: Rise Against originally signed with DreamWorks Records in 2003, but when DreamWorks Records folded into Geffen Records, the band switched labels.) and made its major record label debut with Siren Song of the Counter Culture (2004), followed by The Sufferer & the Witness (2006). Both albums charted on the Billboard 200, with the latter peaking at number ten. Rise Against's popularity continued to grow when they switched labels once again to DGC and Interscope Records, and the next three albums—Appeal to Reason (2008), Endgame (2011), and The Black Market (2014)—charted highly worldwide. Rise Against's eighth album, Wolves, was released in 2017.

Rise Against's music was initially characterized by its gritty combination of hardcore punk and melodic hardcore. With the release of Appeal to Reason, the band's music shifted toward a more accessible and radio-friendly sound, with greater emphasis on production value. The band members are well known for their outspoken social commentary, which often permeates their lyrics. Songs like "Hero of War" and "Survivor Guilt" question the brutality of modern warfare, while "Prayer of the Refugee" is about forced displacement. Not all Rise Against songs discuss controversial topics, such as "Savior", which is about forgiveness and broken relationships.

Tim McIlrath is Rise Against's primary lyricist, while the band members collectively write the music for their songs. Six out of the band's nine albums have been recorded at The Blasting Room in Fort Collins, Colorado, with producers Bill Stevenson and Jason Livermore. Of the band's 142 songs, nineteen have been released as singles, while three have been promotional singles. Rise Against's best charting singles are "Help Is on the Way", which reached number eighty-nine on the Billboard Hot 100; and "Savior", which held the record for the most consecutive weeks spent on both the Hot Rock Songs and Alternative Songs charts, with sixty-three and sixty-five weeks respectively. (Note: "Sail" by Awolnation broke the longevity record on the Hot Rock Songs chart, where it spent ninety-six weeks.) Two singles from Siren Song of the Counter Culture, "Give It All" and "Swing Life Away", helped Rise Against achieve mainstream appeal.

== Songs ==
Key
†	Indicates single release
#	Indicates promotional single release
‡	Indicates cover version

Name of song, writers, originating album, and year released
Song	Writer(s)	Original release	Year	Ref.
"3 Day Weekend"	Rise Against	The Unraveling	2001	
"401 Kill"	Rise Against	The Unraveling	2001	
"1000 Good Intentions"	Rise Against	The Unraveling	2001	
"About Damn Time"	Rise Against	The Eco-Terrorist In Me 7"	2015	
"Alive and Well"	Rise Against	The Unraveling	2001	
"Amber Changing"	Rise Against	Revolutions per Minute	2003	
"Any Way You Want It" ‡	Steve Perry; Neal Schon	Revolutions per Minute	2003	
"Anywhere But Here"	Rise Against	Siren Song of the Counter Culture	2004	
"The Approaching Curve"	Rise Against	The Sufferer & the Witness	2006	
"Architects" #	Rise Against	Endgame	2011	
"The Art of Losing"	Rise Against	The Unraveling	2001	
"Audience of One" †	Rise Against	Appeal to Reason	2008	
"Awake Too Long"	Rise Against	The Black Market	2014	
"Ballad of Hollis Brown" ‡	Bob Dylan	Chimes of Freedom	2012	
"A Beautiful Indifference"	Rise Against	The Black Market	2014	
"Behind Closed Doors"	Rise Against	The Sufferer & the Witness	2006	
"The Black Market"	Rise Against	The Black Market	2014	
"Black Masks & Gasoline"	Rise Against	Revolutions per Minute	2003	
"Blind" ‡	Trever Keith	Face to Face / Rise Against	2011	
"Blood to Bleed"	Rise Against	Siren Song of the Counter Culture	2004	
"Blood-Red, White & Blue"	Rise Against	Revolutions per Minute	2003	
"Boy's No Good" ‡	Lifetime	The Sufferer & the Witness (Note: "Boy's No Good" was included in the Australian tour edition.)	2007	
"Bricks"	Rise Against	The Sufferer & the Witness	2006	
"Bridges"	Rise Against	The Black Market	2014	
"Broadcast[Signal]Frequency"	Rise Against	Wolves (Note: "Broadcast[Signal]Frequency" was included in the Best Buy deluxe edition.)	2017	
"Broken Dreams, Inc." †	Rise Against	Dark Nights: Death Metal soundtrack	2020	
"Broken English"	Rise Against	Revolutions per Minute	2003	
"Broken Mirrors"	Rise Against	Endgame	2011	
"Built to Last" ‡	Sick of It All	The Sufferer & the Witness (Note: "Built to Last" was included in the UK edition.)	2006	
"Bullshit"	Rise Against	Wolves	2017	
"But Tonight We Dance"	Rise Against	The Sufferer & the Witness (Note: "But Tonight We Dance" was included in the Australian tour edition.)	2007	
"Chamber the Cartridge"	Rise Against	The Sufferer & the Witness	2006	
"Collapse (Post-Amerika)"	Rise Against	Appeal to Reason	2008	
"Dancing for Rain"	Rise Against	Siren Song of the Counter Culture	2004	
"Dead Ringer"	Rise Against	Revolutions per Minute	2003	
"Death Blossoms"	Rise Against	Downloadable content for Guitar Hero World Tour	2009	
"Dirt and Roses"	Rise Against	Avengers Assemble (Music from and Inspired by the Motion Picture)	2012	
"The Dirt Whispered"	Rise Against	Appeal to Reason	2008	
"Disparity by Design"	Rise Against	Endgame	2011	
"Drones"	Rise Against	The Sufferer & the Witness	2006	
"The Eco-Terrorist in Me"	Rise Against	The Black Market	2014	
"Elective Amnesia"	Rise Against	Appeal to Reason (Note: "Elective Amnesia" was included in the iTunes edition.)	2008	
"Endgame"	Rise Against	Endgame	2011	
"Entertainment"	Rise Against	Appeal to Reason	2008	
"Escape Artists"	Rise Against	The Black Market (Note: "Escape Artists" was included in the Japanese edition.)	2014	
"Everchanging"	Rise Against	The Unraveling	2001	
"Faint Resemblance"	Rise Against	The Unraveling	2001	
"Far from Perfect"	Rise Against	Wolves	2017	
"The First Drop"	Rise Against	Siren Song of the Counter Culture	2004	
"Fix Me" ‡	Greg Ginn	Siren Song of the Counter Culture (Note: "Fix Me" was included in the 2005 special edition.)	2005	
"Forfeit"	Rise Against	Nowhere Generation	2021	
"From Heads Unworthy"	Rise Against	Appeal to Reason	2008	
"Generation Lost"	Rise Against	Uncontrollable Fatulence	2002	
"A Gentlemen's Coup"	Rise Against	Endgame	2011	
"Gethsemane"	Rise Against	OIL: Chicago Punk Refined	2003	
"The Ghost of Tom Joad" ‡	Bruce Springsteen	Long Forgotten Songs: B-Sides & Covers 2000–2013	2013	
"Give It All" †	Rise Against	Siren Song of the Counter Culture	2004	
"The Good Left Undone" †	Rise Against	The Sufferer & the Witness	2006	
"Grammatizator"	Rise Against	Rise Against 7"	2009	
"Great Awakening"	Rise Against	The Unraveling	2001	
"The Great Die-Off"	Rise Against	The Black Market	2014	
"Hairline Fracture"	Rise Against	Appeal to Reason	2008	
"Halfway There"	Rise Against	Revolutions per Minute	2003	
"Heaven Knows"	Rise Against	Revolutions per Minute	2003	
"Help Is on the Way" †	Rise Against	Endgame	2011	
"Hero of War"	Rise Against	Appeal to Reason	2008	
"Historia Calamitatum"	Rise Against	Appeal to Reason (Note: "Historia Calamitatum" was included in the Australian edition.)	2008	
"House on Fire" †	Rise Against	Wolves	2017	
"How Many Walls"	Rise Against	Wolves	2017	
"I Don't Want to Be Here Anymore" †	Rise Against	The Black Market	2014	
"Injection"	Rise Against	The Sufferer & the Witness	2006	
"Join the Ranks"	Rise Against	Fat Music Volume 5: Live Fat, Die Young	2001	
"Kick Out the Jams" ‡	MC5	Long Forgotten Songs: B-Sides & Covers 2000–2013 (Note: "Kick Out the Jams" was included in the Best Buy edition.)	2013	
"Kotov Syndrome"	Rise Against	Appeal to Reason	2008	
"Lanterns"	Rise Against	Endgame (Note: "Lanterns" was included in the iTunes edition.)	2011	
"Last Chance Blueprint"	Rise Against	Revolutions per Minute	2003	
"Life Less Frightening" †	Rise Against	Siren Song of the Counter Culture	2004	
"Like the Angel" #	Rise Against	Revolutions per Minute	2003	
"Little Boxes" ‡	Malvina Reynolds	Little Boxes Dimebag #1	2008	
"Long Forgotten Sons"	Rise Against	Appeal to Reason	2008	
"Make It Stop (September's Children)" †	Rise Against	Endgame	2011	
"Making Christmas" ‡	Danny Elfman	Nightmare Revisited	2008	
"Megaphone"	Rise Against	Wolves (Note: "Megaphone" was included in the Best Buy deluxe edition.)	2017	
"Methadone"	Rise Against	The Black Market	2014	
"Middle of a Dream"	Rise Against	Nowhere Generation	2021	
"Midnight Hands"	Rise Against	Endgame	2011	
"Minor Threat" ‡	Minor Threat	This Is Noise	2008	
"Miracle"	Rise Against	Wolves	2017	
"Monarch"	Rise Against	Nowhere Generation	2021	
"Mourning in Amerika"	Rise Against	Wolves	2017	
"My Life Inside Your Heart"	Rise Against	The Unraveling	2001	
"Nervous Breakdown" ‡	Greg Ginn	Lords of Dogtown: Music from the Motion Picture	2005	
"Nowhere Generation"	Rise Against	Nowhere Generation	2021	
"The Numbers"	Rise Against	Nowhere Generation	2021	
"Obstructed View"	Rise Against	Your Scene Sucks: The Hardcore Comp	2002	
"Paper Wings"	Rise Against	Siren Song of the Counter Culture	2004	
"Parts Per Million"	Rise Against	Wolves	2017	
"People Live Here"	Rise Against	The Black Market	2014	
"Politics of Love"	Rise Against	Wolves	2017	
"Prayer of the Refugee" †	Rise Against	The Sufferer & the Witness	2006	
"Re-Education (Through Labor)" †	Rise Against	Appeal to Reason	2008	
"Ready to Fall" †	Rise Against	The Sufferer & the Witness	2006	
"Reception Fades"	Rise Against	The Unraveling	2001	
"Remains of Summer Memories"	Rise Against	The Unraveling	2001	
"Roadside"	Rise Against	The Sufferer & the Witness	2006	
"Rules of Play"	Rise Against	Nowhere Generation	2021	
"Rumors of My Demise Have Been Greatly Exaggerated"	Rise Against	Siren Song of the Counter Culture	2004	
"Satellite" †	Rise Against	Endgame	2011	
"Savior" †	Rise Against	Appeal to Reason	2008	
"Sight Unseen"	Rise Against	Appeal to Reason (Note: "Sight Unseen" was included in the Japanese edition.)	2009	
"Six Ways 'Til Sunday"	Rise Against	The Unraveling	2001	
"Sliver" ‡	Kurt Cobain	Long Forgotten Songs: B-Sides & Covers 2000–2013	2013	
"Sometimes Selling Out Is Giving Up"	Rise Against	The Unraveling	2001	
"Sooner or Later"	Rise Against	Nowhere Generation	2021	
"Sounds Like"	Rise Against	Nowhere Generation	2021	
"Stained Glass and Marble"	Rise Against	The Unraveling	2001	
"State of the Union"	Rise Against	Siren Song of the Counter Culture	2004	
"The Strength to Go On"	Rise Against	Appeal to Reason	2008	
"Sudden Life"	Rise Against	The Black Market	2014	
"Sudden Urge"	Rise Against	Nowhere Generation	2021	
"Survive"	Rise Against	The Sufferer & the Witness	2006	
"Survivor Guilt"	Rise Against	Endgame	2011	
"Swing Life Away" †	Neil Hennessy; Tim McIlrath	Siren Song of the Counter Culture	2004	
"Talking to Ourselves"	Rise Against	Nowhere Generation	2021	
"This Is Letting Go"	Rise Against	Endgame	2011	
"Tip the Scales"	Rise Against	Siren Song of the Counter Culture	2004	
"To the Core"	Rise Against	Revolutions per Minute	2003	
"To Them These Streets Belong"	Rise Against	Siren Song of the Counter Culture	2004	
"Torches"	Rise Against	Revolutions per Minute	2003	
"Tragedy + Time" †	Rise Against	The Black Market	2014	
"Under the Knife"	Rise Against	The Sufferer & the Witness	2006	
"The Unraveling"	Rise Against	The Unraveling	2001	
"The Violence" †	Rise Against	Wolves	2017	
"Voice of Dissent"	Rise Against	Rise Against 7"	2009	
"Voices Off Camera:"	Rise Against	Revolutions per Minute	2003	
"Wait for Me" #	Rise Against	Endgame	2011	
"Weight of Time"	Rise Against	The Unraveling	2001	
"Welcome to the Breakdown"	Rise Against	Wolves	2017	
"Whereabouts Unknown"	Rise Against	Appeal to Reason	2008	
"Wolves"	Rise Against	Wolves	2017	
"Worth Dying For"	Rise Against	The Sufferer & the Witness	2006	
"Zero Visibility"	Rise Against	The Black Market	2014	
