= The Black Market (Rise Against album) =

Studio album by Rise Against
- Released: July 15, 2014
- Studio: The Blasting Room (Fort Collins, Colorado)
- Genres: Melodic hardcore; punk rock
- Length: 46:18
- Label: Interscope
- Producers: Bill Stevenson; Jason Livermore

Rise Against chronology
Long Forgotten Songs: B-Sides & Covers 2000–2013 (2013)	The Black Market (2014)	Wolves (2017)

Singles from The Black Market
- 1. "I Don't Want to Be Here Anymore" Released: June 10, 2014; 2. "Tragedy + Time" Released: October 21, 2014; 3. "The Eco-Terrorist in Me" Released: April 18, 2015

The Black Market is the seventh studio album by American punk rock band Rise Against, released on July 15, 2014 through Interscope Records. A melodic hardcore album, The Black Market comprises twelve songs that focus on mid-tempo rhythm, vocal hooks, and strong bridge sections. The album's thematically introspective lyrics are a departure from the band's typical social and political topics, and revolve around dark subject matter.

After touring in support of their 2011 album Endgame, Rise Against took a year-long hiatus, and began recording The Black Market in January 2014 at the Blasting Room in Fort Collins, Colorado. The band members employed new recording techniques, such as greater usage of analog signals on a Kemper amplifier, and an Evertune bridge to keep the guitars in tune. The Black Market debuted at number three on the Billboard 200, becoming Rise Against's fourth consecutive album to chart within the top ten. The album also charted highly in several other countries such as Canada, where it became Rise Against's third consecutive album to reach number one on the Canadian Albums Chart.

Critics praised the more introspective lyrics on The Black Market, but were divided in their opinions on the music; some found the music to be formulaic and stale, while others felt it was more nuanced than previous Rise Against material, and that it complemented the lyrics. To promote the album, Rise Against toured throughout 2014 and 2015 with several other rock bands, such as Touché Amoré, Pennywise, and Killswitch Engage.

== Background and recording ==
Rise Against released their sixth studio album, Endgame, in 2011. A commercial success, the band toured in support of the album for two years, and released the compilation album Long Forgotten Songs: B-Sides & Covers 2000–2013 in 2013. Guitarist Zach Blair noted how the extensive touring took a toll on the band members. He said, "You’re constantly gone. You don't feel like you live anywhere". He also discussed how the other three band members' lives had evolved, and were away from their families for months on end. "It's an interesting thing to kind of realize that and kind of get out of the bubble, get out of the bus, and go 'Oh, geez, we actually have lives outside of what we do.'" Rise Against took a year-long hiatus, and reconvened in January 2014 to begin work on The Black Market.

The band chose Bill Stevenson and Jason Livermore to produce the album. The duo had produced four of Rise Against's last five albums, and the two parties developed a strong rapport with each other over the years. The album was recorded at the Blasting Room in Fort Collins, Colorado. When asked about the Blasting Room, Blair said: "You go up there and just live, breathe, and eat your record. There aren't any distractions, and that's really what works for us". The Black Market featured new recording techniques for Rise Against. The band tweaked its guitar tones by using more analog signals on a Kemper amplifier, and used an Evertune bridge to keep the guitars in tune. This facilitated a greater focus on the creative aspects of recording, rather than just technical ones. As singer Tim McIlrath put it: "I want the songs to feel a certain way. I want the songs to hit the guy and the girl who don't really care about guitar tones." Stevenson wanted to maintain the rawness of McIlrath's vocals as opposed to smoothing them out like on previous albums.

As Rise Against's primary lyricist, McIlrath elected to have introspection as the major theme of the album. At first, McIlrath wanted to write about the role of Rise Against for himself and the listeners. As the songwriting sessions progressed, McIlrath began to write about more personal experiences, which he described as "a cathartic experience." He continued, saying, "So the silver lining was how you deal with it. It was a form of therapy, and what I wanted to do on this album was confront all of it." The theme of introspection differed from the band's previous material, which often focused on social and political issues. McIlrath noted the new theme arose from the idea that the band members were seven albums into their career, and that the lyrics necessitated a new approach. He also said that the introspection theme affected the music on the album, as the band members took the approach of "what else can we say that we haven't said before?"

== Composition ==
=== Music and lyrics ===
"I Don't Want to Be Here Anymore"
A twenty-four second sample of "I Don't Want to Be Here Anymore". Like most of The Black Market, "I Don't Want to Be Here Anymore" is a melodic hardcore song with strong vocal hooks.

AllMusic's Gregory Heaney described The Black Market as a more toned-down version of Endgame, while Andy Biddulph of Rock Sound said it was the amalgamation of all of Rise Against's previous material. Biddulph wrote how the album featured the "pressing riffs" of The Sufferer & the Witness (2006) mixed with the pop punk sound of Appeal to Reason (2008). Max Qayyum of Punknews.org disagreed with this view, and said The Black Market was the greatest departure from the band's original sound, and that it had a distinct rock sound when compared to the band's previous material. The album's lyrics are thematically introspective, and often focus on dark subject matter. This is reflected in the album's title, which was inspired by the "marketplace of emotions" McIlrath had to sift through to write the lyrics.

=== Songs ===
The first song on The Black Market, "The Great Die-Off", begins with instrumentation on a violin before transitioning into a fast guitar section with heavy bass. According to McIlrath, the song is about "a generation's type of thinking dying off, as the people who think it die off [...] it's about bigotry, which persists as long as these people do". The next two songs, "I Don't Want to Be Here Anymore" and "Tragedy + Time" feature more personal messages; "I Don't Want to Be Here Anymore" is about resolving to escape from the dark moments in one's life, while pop punk-driven "Tragedy + Time" tells the listener to push through hardship and that life will eventually get better. "The Eco-Terrorist in Me" is a short, fast-paced hardcore punk song, similar to songs from Rise Against's 2003 album Revolutions per Minute, and features screaming vocals. Its lyrics advocate for environmental and animal activism via eco-terrorism.

James Hickie of Kerrang! said "Sudden Life" has "arena-tantalizing melodies", and is about the fading will to live. McIlrath noted that the band experimented with the sonics on "Sudden Life", and how he felt it sounded similar to the music of U2 and Foo Fighters. "A Beautiful Indifference" chastises armchair activists during Occupy movements, while "Methadone" tells of a crumbling relationship. The next song, "Zero Visibility", fuses classic rock riffs with numerous tempo changes. McIlrath said "Awake Too Long" is about taking in the negativity in the world, and the desire to "close your eyes and be ignorant to all of it". The penultimate song is an acoustic ballad called "People Live Here", which references gun control and the Sandy Hook Elementary School shooting. The final song, "Bridges", "skirts between tempos and does so cleverly, maintaining energy throughout," according to Qayyum.

== Release ==
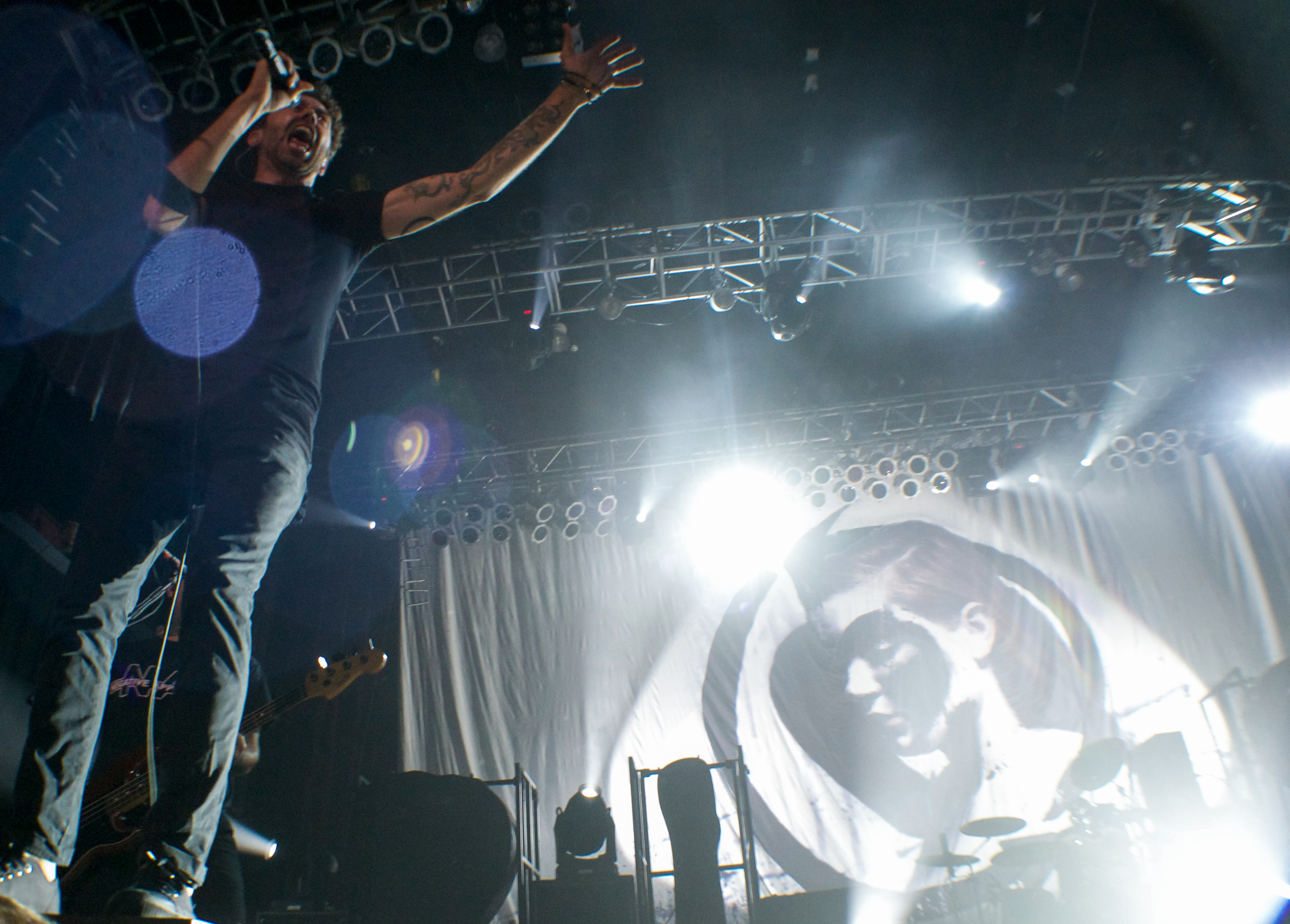
McIlrath performing with Rise Against at the House of Blues in Boston

On April 14, 2014, Rise Against posted a video on their Facebook page teasing a new album with images of the band members in-studio and the message "Coming Soon." Two months later, Rise Against posted another teaser video, which revealed their seventh studio album, titled The Black Market, would be released July 15. To promote the album, Rise Against embarked on world tour throughout 2014, with supporting bands Touché Amoré and Radkey for North American performances, and the bands Pennywise and Emily's Army for European performances. This was followed by guest appearances on Linkin Park's The Hunting Party Tour, and a summer tour in 2015 with Killswitch Engage and Letlive.

In the United States, The Black Market debuted at number three on the Billboard 200 and sold 53,000 copies in its first week. It was their fourth consecutive album to debut in the top ten on the Billboard 200, and it spent eleven weeks on the chart. Elsewhere on Billboard charts, The Black Market peaked at number one on the Top Alternative Albums, Top Rock Albums, and Top Hard Rock Albums charts. On the Canadian Albums Chart, The Black Market became Rise Against's third consecutive album to peak at number one. It was certified gold by Music Canada in 2014, denoting shipments of 40,000 copies.

The Black Market's first single, "I Don't Want to Be Here Anymore", reached number twenty-one on the Billboard Hot Rock Songs chart, their lowest peak single since the inception of chart in 2009. The single did find more success on the Alternative Songs and Mainstream Rock charts, peaking at numbers thirteen and five respectively. Internationally, "I Don't Want to Be Here Anymore" peaked at number ninety-two on the Canadian Hot 100, and number sixty-nine on Australia's Top 100 Singles Chart, Rise Against's only single to chart within the top 100 in Australia. The Black Market's second single, "Tragedy + Time", did not chart on the Hot Rock Songs chart, but it did peak at number twenty-six and twenty-eight on the Alternative Songs and Mainstream Rock charts respectively. "The Eco-Terrorist in Me" was released as a separate 7-inch single on April 18, 2015, coinciding with Record Store Day. The song featured two B-sides: the previously unreleased "About Damn Time" and "We Will Never Forget", a spoken word performance by American journalist Will Potter.

Accompanying music videos were shot for the two singles. The video for "I Don't Want to Be Here Anymore" features documentary-style footage of Chicago residents discussing gun violence in the city, overlaid with statistics about several acts of global violence, including the Mexican drug war, the Chibok schoolgirls kidnapping, and animal poaching. The "Tragedy + Time" video features the band performing amidst a series of white blocks as darkened shadows blur their image. These clips are interspersed with clips of a naked redheaded woman kneeling in front of the same blocks. Rise Against also produced a video for "People Live Here" despite it not being a single. The video follows the daily lives of a businessman and a man living on low income. According to Radio.com, the video criticizes people who insulate themselves from the lives of others by remaining in their own bubble.

For its 6th anniversary, the band released an expanded version of the album on July 15, 2020, which included the Japanese bonus track "Escape Artist" and the B-sides from "The Eco-Terrorist in Me" Single.

== Critical reception ==
Professional ratings
Aggregate scores
Source	Rating
Metacritic	76/100
Review scores
Source	Rating
AllMusic	3.5/5 stars
Alternative Press	4/5 stars
Consequence of Sound	C+
Exclaim!	6/10
Kerrang!	5/5
Rock Sound	7/10
Sputnikmusic	3.5/5

The Black Market was met with mostly positive reviews. On Metacritic, it scored 76/100 from 7 critics, indicating "generally favorable reviews". James Hickie of Kerrang! gave the album a perfect score, and called it "a magnificent wake-up call [...] one of the year's best and most intellectual records". Most critics however did not give The Black Market as good of a score, but were generally positive in their opinions. AllMusic's Gregory Heaney noted that although it may not be Rise Against's best album, it was its most timeless album, and commended the more universal lyrics. Ryan Bray of Consequence of Sound described The Black Market as a "healthy, mixed bag", while Andy Biddulph of Rock Sound wrote "The Black Market falls into the unfortunate category of being a good album by a great band." Punknews.org's May Qayyum wrote a more negative review, in which he said the album had potential but was ultimately disappointing and a misstep in the band's discography.

Heaney said The Black Market's music worked in tandem with the personal lyrics, as it allowed the listener to experience other emotions besides outrage; this sentiment was shared by Hickie. Both Bray and Exclaim!'s Peter Sanfilippo felt the album's music did not significantly differ from the music featured on Endgame, and that Rise Against's melodic hardcore sound had grown stale. By contrast, the Sputnikmusic review complimented the music, and noted how musical variation in The Black Market eschewed the monotonous nature of Endgame. The reviewer ultimately said that it was Rise Against's best album since The Sufferer & the Witness. Biddulph wrote the use of pop rock driven melodies "ensures they’re not at their worst, but the middling nature of this album means the Chicago veterans are certainly nowhere near their finest".

Several critics appreciated the more personal lyrics, as they provided a much-needed reprieve from the aggressively political lyrics found in nearly all of the band's previous albums. Bray felt there was a "winning quality" in listening to the more personal songs as opposed to songs about failed relationships, while Heaney said the more personal songs prove that "a move doesn't have to be loud to be bold". Biddulph found the personal songs to be a rare glimpse of human vulnerability from Rise Against, but that they were undermined by more political songs such as "The Eco-Terrorist in Me". Mischa Pearlman of Alternative Press noted how most of the lyrics were open to interpretation, and that regardless of how the listener interpreted them, they were forged with "visceral emotion".

The Black Market was included in Kerrang! and Rock Sound's lists of the fifty best albums of 2014, at number six and thirty-three respectively.

== Track listing ==
All lyrics written by Tim McIlrath, except where noted; all music composed by Rise Against

No.	Title	Length
1.	"The Great Die-Off"	3:39
2.	"I Don't Want to Be Here Anymore"	3:59
3.	"Tragedy + Time"	4:17
4.	"The Black Market"	4:15
5.	"The Eco-Terrorist in Me"	2:45
6.	"Sudden Life"	4:08
7.	"A Beautiful Indifference"	3:24
8.	"Methadone"	3:48
9.	"Zero Visibility"	4:38
10.	"Awake Too Long"	3:11
11.	"People Live Here"	4:08
12.	"Bridges"	4:06
Total length:		46:18

The Black Market – Japanese edition
No.	Title	Length
13.	"Escape Artists"	4:02
Total length:		50:20

The Black Market – Expanded edition
No.	Title	Writer(s)	Length
13.	"Escape Artists"		4:02
14.	"About Damn Time"		3:36
15.	"We Will Never Forget"	Will Potter	6:03
Total length:			59:59

== Personnel ==
Credits adapted from the liner notes of The Black Market.

Rise Against

- Tim McIlrath – lead vocals, rhythm guitar (guitar solo on "Zero Visibility")
- Zach Blair – lead guitar, backing vocals
- Joe Principe – bass guitar, backing vocals
- Brandon Barnes – drums, percussion

Artwork

- LeAnn Mueller – photography
- Dina Hovsepian – album artwork

Additional musicians

- Chad Price (of All) – backing vocals
- Ian Short – violin on "The Great Die-Off" and "People Live Here"
- Adrienne Short – viola on "The Great Die-Off" and "People Live Here"
- Amy Morgan – cello on "People Live Here"

Production

- Bill Stevenson – production, engineering
- Jason Livermore – production, engineering
- Andrew Berlin, Chris Beeble – engineering, additional production
- Chris Lord-Alge – mixing
- Keith Armstrong and Nik Karpen – additional engineering
- Dmitar "Dim-E" Krnjaic – additional assistance
- Ted Jensen – mastering

== Charts ==
=== Weekly charts ===
Chart (2014)	Peak position
Australian Albums (ARIA)	3
Austrian Albums (Ö3 Austria)	3
Belgian Albums (Ultratop Flanders)	19
Belgian Albums (Ultratop Wallonia)	118
Canadian Albums (Billboard)	1
Danish Albums (Hitlisten)	31
Dutch Albums (Album Top 100)	43
Finnish Albums (Suomen virallinen lista)	22
German Albums (Offizielle Top 100)	1
Japanese Albums (Oricon)	124
New Zealand Albums (RMNZ)	6
Swiss Albums (Schweizer Hitparade)	5
UK Albums (Official Charts)	13
UK Rock & Metal Albums (OCC)	2
US Billboard 200	3
US Top Alternative Albums (Billboard)	1
US Top Rock Albums (Billboard)	1
US Top Hard Rock Albums (Billboard)	1

=== Year-end charts ===
Chart (2014)	Position
Australian Albums (ARIA)	99
German Albums (Offizielle Top 100)	87
US Alternative Albums (Billboard)	27
US Top Rock Albums (Billboard)	46
US Hard Rock Albums (Billboard)	14

== Certifications ==
Region	Certification	Certified units/sales
Canada (Music Canada)	Gold	40,000^{‡}
Germany (BVMI)	Gold	100,000^{‡}
^{‡} Sales+streaming figures based on certification alone.
