= Wolves (Rise Against album) =

Studio album by Rise Against
- Released: June 9, 2017
- Studio: Rock Falcon Studio (Nashville, Tennessee)
- Genres: Punk rock; melodic hardcore
- Length: 40:04
- Label: Virgin
- Producer: Nick Raskulinecz

Rise Against chronology
The Black Market (2014)	Wolves (2017)	The Ghost Note Symphonies, Vol. 1 (2018)

Rise Against studio album chronology
The Black Market (2014)	Wolves (2017)	Nowhere Generation (2021)

Singles from Wolves
- 1. "The Violence" Released: April 20, 2017; 2. "House on Fire" Released: January 9, 2018

Wolves is the eighth studio album by the American punk rock band Rise Against. It was released on June 9, 2017. It is their first studio album since 2004's Siren Song of the Counter Culture to be produced by the band without long time producers, Bill Stevenson and Jason Livermore, and their only studio album to be released through Virgin Records. The album's lead single, "The Violence", was released on April 20, 2017. Two more songs, "House on Fire" and "Welcome to the Breakdown" were released on May 19 and June 2, respectively, as pre-release buzz tracks.

The album debuted at number nine on the Billboard 200 albums chart, becoming their fifth straight top ten record.

== Background and recording ==
Rise Against released their seventh studio album, The Black Market, in 2014. When it came time for the band to record a follow-up, they initially struggled to find a direction. Vocalist Tim McIlrath recalled, "I was trying to figure out where Rise Against fitted in - in the musical world and our fans' lives. We got started and then the U.S. election happened. That's when things clicked into place. The frontline became very visible to me and I knew exactly what we needed to do. We had to get off our asses and engage."

The band recorded Wolves at Rock Falcon Studio in Nashville, Tennessee. McIlrath recalled "It was clear we'd also put ourselves physically outside of our comfort zone by leaving Chicago, which is this liberal nest where you're hard-pressed to find someone who disagrees with the progressive politics of Rise Against... I think it's really good for anybody to see both sides of the fence and spend time in a place that is hurting—and helping to create the narrative of the country you live in. That was something that was kind of always on my mind, knowing that there are people out there who fell for someone like Donald Trump, who were conned by him, and that these are people just like you and me. So we have to work out how to bridge that gap and figure out where the truth lies in a lot of our arguments with each other."

The deluxe edition of the album, exclusive to Best Buy, contains two bonus tracks, "Megaphone" and "Broadcast[Signal]Frequency", that have been described as a return to Rise Against's faster hardcore sound exemplified in earlier albums such as The Unraveling and Revolutions per Minute. When asked in a Reddit AMA about why they were not included on the standard album, McIlrath responded, "because lazy Tim didn't finish the lyrics in time." The two tracks were released as digital singles in 2018.

== Music and lyrical themes ==
Wolves is a melodic hardcore album, with influences of pop punk and hardcore punk. It comprises eleven tracks that mostly follow a similar musical formula. The A.V. Club describes the formula as: "a frenetic intro; usually an instrument or two getting quiet for the verse; a slight pause before the refrain; and then a massive half-tempo stomp, leading into another verse, refrain, or bridge."

The lyrics in Wolves follow the band's usual political themes; however, this time around, the band tackles the 2016 presidential election. Songs like "How Many Walls", "Welcome to the Breakdown" and the title track oppose the views of Donald Trump (just as they did George W. Bush during his time in office) since the band members are supporters of progressive politics, while tracks like "House on Fire" and "Politics of Love" are more personal while retaining some political leanings. The lyrics do not specifically refer to American issues; McIlrath stated that "We're not an American band, we're a global one. We have Trump, the U.K. has Brexit. This is a human problem."

McIlrath stated in an interview with The Shrine Auditorium that "In many ways, a Rise Against show is a safe space for our fans. But I realized that I don't only want to create safe spaces, I want to create dangerous spaces where misogyny can't exist, where xenophobia can't exist. I want to create spaces where those sentiments don't have any air, and they suffocate: where those ideas die. Wolves isn't about creating a safe space, it's about creating a space that's dangerous for injustice."

The video for lead single "The Violence" was banned from shooting due to being "anti-government". The band had gained a permit to film the video in a farm field containing busts of all 43 United States presidents. The permit issued by the farm's board of directors was rescinded during filming due to its "anti-American" message.

=== Album title ===
According to McIlrath, the title Wolves refers to "being wolves at the gate, being angry at authority, being angry at the direction of the country and the world, and fighting back. We are the wolves, and the wolves are the good guys in the narrative. We're taking back control." During the writing process, the album was to be titled Mourning in America. However, after the 2016 United States presidential election, McIlrath changed his mind, proclaiming "Fuck that. Fuck grieving."

== Reception ==
Professional ratings
Aggregate scores
Source	Rating
Metacritic	76/100
Review scores
Source	Rating
AllMusic	3.5/5 stars
Alternative Press	4/5 stars
The A.V. Club	C+
Clash	7/10
Classic Rock	4/5 stars
Kerrang!	5/5
Metal Hammer	3.5/5 stars
Paste	5.8/10
Rock Sound	7/10
Sputnikmusic	2.2/5

Wolves currently holds a 76/100 on the review aggregator website Metacritic, which indicates "generally favorable reviews". Loudwire's Chad Bowar described the album as "an appealing combination of catchy songs and thoughtful, passionate lyrics", while Nik Young of Metal Hammer commented "Rise Against certainly know how to sweep you along for the ride". Both Alternative Press and Rock Sound wrote that the album provides a sense of rebellion and hope. Alternative Press in particular wrote: "Of course, this album won't beat Trump's administration alone, but it's part of a vital movement that's prepared to stand up and fight against it." In contrast, Paste critic Scott Heisel said "For being one of the first big punk albums in post-Trump America, Wolves doesn't howl nearly enough and rarely shows its fangs". Sputnikmusic expanded upon this notion by writing: "What's missing here, what's been missing for years, is just a 'Swing Life Away'. Something fragile and self-indulgent and real. We never ever doubted that you know how to be political, Rise Against. We just doubted that you still know how to be real."

Nearly every critic noted how the music of Wolves sounded very similar to Rise Against's previous material. Some critics wrote positively of the music, like Bowar, who praised the band for maintaining their core sound without being stagnant, and James Christopher Monger of AllMusic, who said the album's music would please longtime fans who wanted "something new to pump their fists to". Most critics however were dissatisfied with the musical similarities. Rock Sound wrote "familiarity does dull the edges of their less immediate efforts", while Heisel commented "Wolves, for or better or worse, feels like it could've been recorded a decade ago, or maybe three years from now". A reviewer for Sputnikmusic was especially disappointed by the musical similarities, writing: "The thing is, though, if you'll permit me to borrow the buzzword-iest of Shakespeare lines; Wolves is a whole bunch of sound and fury, signifying nothing." The reviewer went on to discuss how the music was stubbornly tepid, and that every chorus felt lukewarm and flaccid.

Some reviewers described the lyrics as "earnest", with Young commenting "[Rise Against's] passion is unwavering, their lyrics earnest and their energy inspiring". Josh Gray of Clash commented on the unique juxtaposition of lyrical themes, such as pacifism in "The Violence" and aggression in "Wolves". Heisel and Spunikmusic were critical of the vague lyrics on Wolves. The Sputnikmusic reviewer jokingly likened the lyrics to "an entitled soccer mum at a game where her beloved son has lost". Kerrang! however commended this aspect, noting how the lyrics allow the listener to reach their own conclusions instead of merely preaching the band members beliefs. Bowar complimented the production value of Raskulinecz, noting how he gave the music "plenty of punch and clarity without making things too slick". Alex McLevy of The A.V. Club however criticized Raskulinecz by writing "Wolves is somehow even more polished, almost glossy to a fault with its compression and ladled-on sweetening of the distortion. At times, it veers dangerously close to latter-day Metallica".

== Commercial performance ==
Wolves debuted at number nine on the US Billboard 200 with 29,000 album-equivalent units, of which 27,000 were pure album sales.

== Track listing ==
No.	Title	Length
1.	"Wolves"	3:37
2.	"House on Fire"	3:14
3.	"The Violence"	3:48
4.	"Welcome to the Breakdown"	3:03
5.	"Far from Perfect"	3:32
6.	"Bullshit"	4:12
7.	"Politics of Love"	4:09
8.	"Parts Per Million"	3:40
9.	"Mourning in Amerika"	3:19
10.	"How Many Walls"	3:50
11.	"Miracle"	3:40
Total length:		40:04

Deluxe edition bonus tracks
No.	Title	Length
12.	"Megaphone"	3:05
13.	"Broadcast[Signal]Frequency"	2:30
Total length:		45:46

== Personnel ==
Credits adapted from the liner notes of Wolves.

Rise Against

- Tim McIlrath – lead vocals, rhythm guitar (solo on "Wolves" and "Megaphone")
- Zach Blair – lead guitar, backing vocals
- Joe Principe – bass guitar, backing vocals
- Brandon Barnes – drums, percussion

Additional musicians

- Jesse Michaels – backing vocals on "Bullshit"

Artwork

- Casey Quintal – album design
- Travis Shine – photography
- Nicole Frantz – creative direction

Production

- Nick Raskulinecz – production, recording
- Nathan Yarborough – recording
- Jordan Logue – recording assistance
- D. Sardy – mixing
- James Monti – mixing engineer
- Joe LaPorta – mastering

Management

- PMM, INC – management
- Evan Peters – A&R
- Corrie Christopher – booking agent for Paradigm
- Marlene Tsucii – international booking Agent for CAA
- Stacy Fass – legal
- Arjun Pulijal – marketing
- Zach Zeisler and Lorabel Trias – business management for ZZRJ, LLP
- Nicole Frantz – creative direction
- David Helfer – business affairs

== Charts ==
=== Weekly charts ===
Chart (2017)	Peak position
Australian Albums (ARIA)	5
Austrian Albums (Ö3 Austria)	5
Belgian Albums (Ultratop Flanders)	27
Belgian Albums (Ultratop Wallonia)	81
Canadian Albums (Billboard)	3
Dutch Albums (Album Top 100)	76
German Albums (Offizielle Top 100)	5
New Zealand Albums (RMNZ)	20
Scottish Albums (Official Charts)	26
Spanish Albums (PROMUSICAE)	92
Swiss Albums (Schweizer Hitparade)	11
UK Albums (Official Charts)	38
US Billboard 200	9
US Top Alternative Albums (Billboard)	1
US Top Rock Albums (Billboard)	1
US Top Hard Rock Albums (Billboard)	1

=== Year-end charts ===
Chart (2017)	Position
German Albums (Offizielle Top 100)	86
