= The Fireside Bowl =

Bowling alley and former all-ages music venue in Chicago

Coordinates: 41°55′29.94″N 87°41′38.85″W

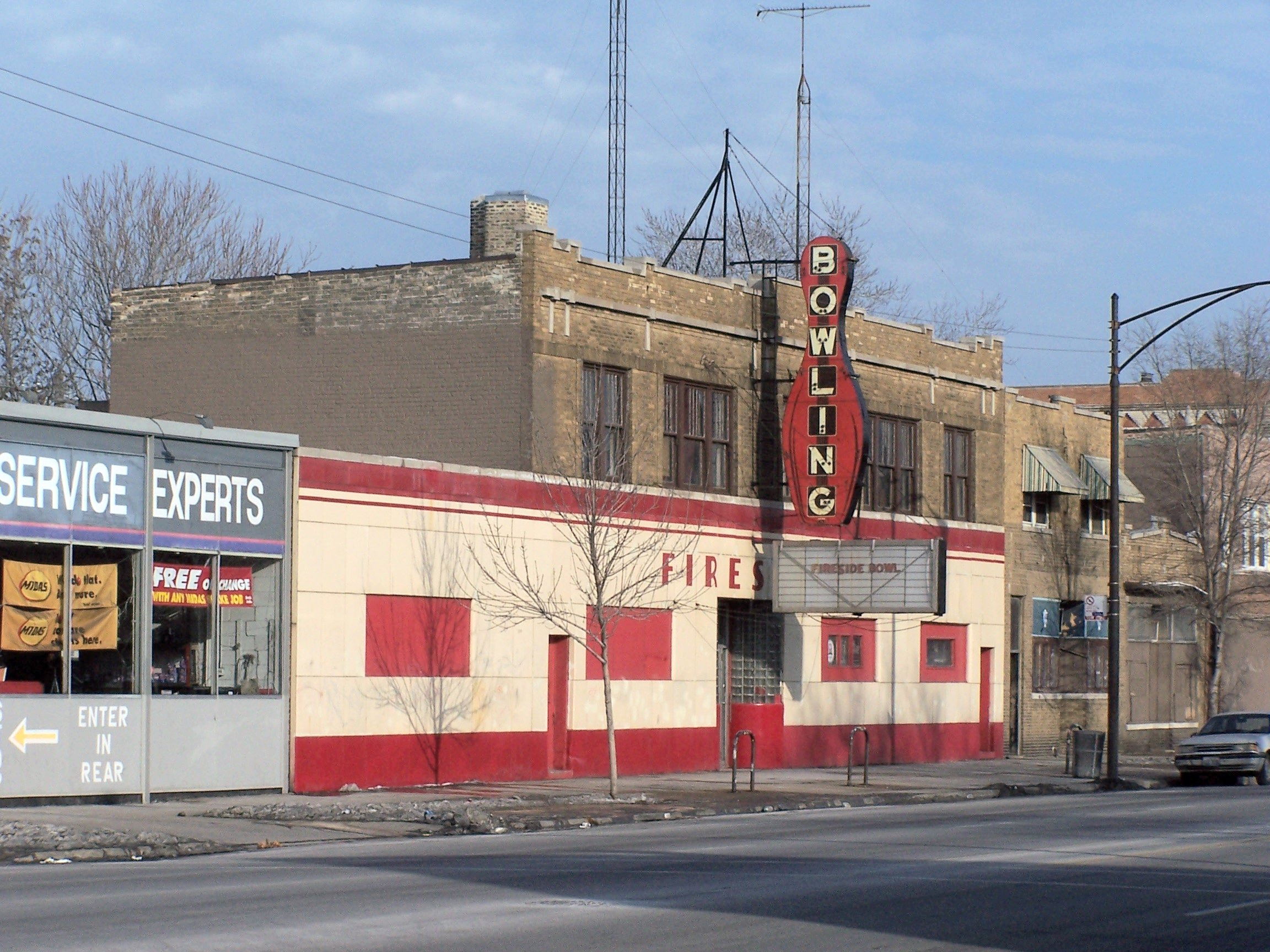
Fireside Bowl

The Fireside Bowl, commonly known as Fireside Bowl or the Fireside, is a bowling alley on West Fullerton Avenue in Logan Square, Chicago, Illinois. It was converted into a bowling alley in 1941. From 1994 to 2004, it operated as a nationally recognized all-ages venue for punk and independent music. After its regular concert program ended, the business returned its focus to bowling. It remained open with numerous bowling leagues in 2026.

== History ==
=== Bowling alley ===
Owner Henry Sophie converted the building into a 12-lane bowling alley in 1941. Four lanes were added in 1956, bringing the total to 16. The property passed to the Lapinski family in the mid-1960s. By the early 1990s, declining bowling business had brought the Fireside close to failure, and Rich Lapinski's son Jim took over its operation.

=== All-ages music venue ===
In the early 1990s, Fireside regular Russ Forster organized "disco bowl" nights and suggested the alley to Los Crudos musician Martin Sorrondeguy as a possible one-off concert space. Chicago-area bookers Brian Peterson and David Eaves subsequently approached Jim Lapinski about presenting regular shows. By the summer of 1994, they were booking concerts several nights a week, and the Fireside had become better known as a music venue than as a bowling alley. Peterson, the founder of Chicago promoter MP Productions, booked local and touring bands at the venue.

Although the room was formally rented like a hall, it became an all-ages destination on the national punk touring circuit. The stage stood at one end of a long, narrow room perpendicular to the bowling lanes.

The Fireside initially booked almost exclusively punk, but by 2002 its programming had broadened to hip-hop, electro-wave, and heavy metal. Acts that appeared there included Blink-182, My Chemical Romance, Taking Back Sunday, Bikini Kill, and Sleater-Kinney. Its all-ages policy gave under-21 fans access to live music when most Chicago rock clubs and bars could not admit them. The Fireside served as a center of the city's punk scene through much of the 1990s. Beyond hosting concerts, the Fireside connected local and touring bands, gave emerging Chicago concert bookers practical experience, and served as a networking space for young musicians and fans. In 2008, Pete Wentz said that small independent shows such as those at the Fireside were essential to his musical development and the emergence of Fall Out Boy.

Larger crowds brought police interventions over capacity and complaints from neighbors about noise, parking, underage drinking, and public urination. The city also threatened to acquire the property through eminent domain for an expansion of nearby Haas Park, although the acquisition did not take place. Lapinski said he had grown tired of the risks of operating a concert venue and wanted the more predictable schedule of a full-time bowling alley. Regular concerts ended in August 2004, after which the owners renovated the lanes and refocused the business on bowling.

=== Return to bowling and later concerts ===
By January 2005, the Fireside primarily offered bowling, with fewer concerts restricted to patrons aged 21 and over. The Fireside began a trial run of live shows in June 2010. By 2013, concerts were limited to roughly six to eight weeks during the summer because bowling leagues used the building during the rest of the year, and bowling remained the primary business.

== In popular culture ==
Alkaline Trio references the Fireside and a U.S. Maple performance in its song "Goodbye Forever". Allister paid homage to the venue in its song "Somewhere on Fullerton". Parts of Rise Against's music video for "Swing Life Away" were filmed at the Fireside. Comedian Kyle Kinane recounts a story involving the Fireside Bowl and a search for a restroom on his 2010 debut album, Death of the Party.

The Fireside Bowl was used as a filming location for The Break-Up. It appears in the film Widows. The bowling alley has also been used as a filming location for the television series Chicago Fire and Chicago P.D..
