= Break Even (band) =

Australian hardcore punk band

- Origin: Perth, Western Australia, Australia
- Genres: Hardcore punk, melodic hardcore
- Years active: 2005–2012, 2014–2016
- Labels: Common Bond, Anchors Aweigh, Resist
- Past members: Mark Bawden; Simon Dreja; Steffen Sciuto; Perri Basile; Ash Pederick; Rowan Willoughby
- Website: myspace.com/breakevenhc

Break Even was an Australian hardcore punk band from Perth, which formed in 2005. For most of the band's run, the band was composed of Perri Basile on bass guitar, Mark Bawden on lead vocals, Simon Dreja on drums and Steffen Sciuto on guitar. Their debut album, The Bright Side, was released in June 2009 and was dedicated to the band's original guitarist Rowan Willoughby, who died in November 2008. The group split in July 2012 but reconvened in December 2014. The band has been inactive since 2016.

== History ==
Break Even formed in Perth in 2005 as a hardcore punk band with Mark Bawden on lead vocals, Simon Dreja on drums, Ash Pederick (ex-Miles Away) on guitar, Steffen Sciuto on bass guitar and Rowan Willoughby on lead guitar. Bawden later recalled, "the Perth music scene is good, there's a whole bunch of bands out there. My cousin got me into the music and took me to my first local show. I met a few friends and that's really how the band got started."

Their seven-track debut extended play, Young at Heart (2006), was issued on Common Bond Records. The lead track, "Another Night", was co-written by Sciuto, Willoughby, Dreja, Bawden and Pederick. In the following year they issued a split EP, Break Something Even More, with three of their tracks and four tracks from label mates, Something More. By that time Perri Basile had joined on bass guitar, Pederick had left and Sciuto switched to guitar. Their first track, "Run for Your Life", was co-written by Bawden, Sciuto, Dreja and Basile.

On 19 November 2008 Rowan Willoughby died from suicide, which threatened the future of the band. In an interview, Bawden explained how they continued. "We had a jam in the December holidays," he said. "We knew we could still do something and we ended up writing an album as a four-piece." The band released their debut album, The Bright Side, in June 2009. Explaining the title, Bawden said: "There is so much anger apathy around and this is our way of encouraging people to find the bright side in everything." It was recorded in March at Perth's Reading Room Studios. The album peaked at number 78 on the ARIA Albums Chart.

Dizzy of Cack Blabbath felt The Bright Side was "made up of very well crafted songs, and there is much more going on here than in 'traditional' Hardcore. The atmospheric passages that weave their way through the soul of the album give it a powerful impact. It benefits from some excellent guitar work that really lets the band exercise their growing musical muscle, even including a nicely worked Piano passage as the title track." Punktastic's Paul described it as a "superb album" and explained, "While I tend to enjoy the faster bands in the scene, this lot mix things up well – the music is hard and heavy but the message is positive and the juxtaposition works brilliantly... There's a real Defeater vibe to some of this record and I think fans of that kind of ‘'slow-burn' hardcore will really love this band."

The group undertook a national tour to promote the album during October 2009.

=== Breakup ===
On 23 February 2012, Break Even announced their breakup through various internet communities. The message to their fans on Facebook read;

"It is with sadness that we announce Break Even have decided to part ways. Over time the commitments in our lives other than the band have become more important and despite our best efforts to persist with the band after all the writing and touring over the last few years we have to come to the end of the road... We have made so many friends and seen so many places through our music and couldn't be happier at what we have seen and done. Thanks to anyone that has come to a show, let us stay at their house, put a show on for us, released our music or just supported us in anyway possible. We are forever grateful. THANK YOU "

The band did their final national tour as a part of the Soundwave Festival in February 2012 and announced their final dates for July 2012.

=== Reformation ===
In December 2014 they made several updates via Facebook announcing they would be touring in February 2015, on the "I'd Rather Be Giggin'" Tour, with special guests Hopeless, Endless Heights and Postblue, they also released a new song entitled "Young & Bright". They released a statement on their website explaining their decision to reform and the meaning behind the new song;

We wrote Young and Bright with a sense of nostalgia about everything we had been through as a band and more so as people and how the music impacted our lives.

Sadly Break Even ended abruptly and we never got a chance to thank everyone the way we wanted to. We played our last show in 2012, but there have always been constant reminders of the music, to where it has never truly left our hearts.

Young and Bright is a thank you song to everyone who has supported our music, us as people and us as a band over the years. 2015 will see Break Even release the record we never got to finish. Without your loyalty and support, we wouldn't be who and where we are today.

Thank you.

In May 2016, the band supported the Australian tour of United Kingdom band Basement and American band Turnover. Following the tour, the band folded once again.

== Members ==
Final line-up

- Mark Bawden – vocals (2005–2012, 2014–2016)
- Simon Dreja – drums (2005–2012, 2014–2016)
- Steffen Sciuto – bass guitar (2005–2007), guitar (2007–2012, 2014–2016)

Former

- Ash Pederick – guitar (2005–2007)
- Rowan Willoughby – guitar (2005–2008; died 2008)
- Perri Basile – bass guitar (2007–2012, 2014–2016)
- Jem Snow - bass guitar fill in for a couple tours

== Discography ==
Studio albums

Year	Album details	Peak chart positions	
Year	Album details	ARIA	AIR
2009	The Bright Side: Released: 19 June 2009; Label: Resist Records/Anchors Aweigh Records	78	7
