= Long Forgotten Songs: B-Sides & Covers 2000–2013 =

Compilation album by Rise Against
- Released: September 10, 2013
- Genres: Hardcore punk; melodic hardcore
- Length: 78:17
- Label: Interscope

Rise Against chronology
Endgame (2011)	Long Forgotten Songs: B-Sides & Covers 2000–2013 (2013)	The Black Market (2014)

Rise Against compilation album chronology
Long Forgotten Songs: B-Sides & Covers 2000–2013 (2013)	The Ghost Note Symphonies, Vol. 1 (2018)

Long Forgotten Songs: B-Sides & Covers 2000–2013 is a compilation album by American punk rock band Rise Against, released on September 10, 2013. The album comprises twenty-six lesser known Rise Against songs, primarily B-sides, covers and different versions of already existing songs by the band. The idea for the album came about when the members of Rise Against attempted to catalog their lesser known material, but came to the conclusion that there were some songs that they did not own copies of. Long Forgotten Songs peaked at number nineteen on the Billboard 200, and charted in several other countries. The album received generally favorable reviews; several critics said the covers were the best aspect of the album, and noted how many of the songs felt fully fleshed out despite being relegated to B-sides.

== Background and composition ==
While backstage at the 2013 Orion Music + More festival, the members of Rise Against attempted to catalog their lesser known B-sides and covers, but came to the conclusion that there were some songs that they did not own copies of. These songs were often included in Fat Music compilation albums or soundtrack albums. As lead singer Tim McIlrath put it: "If the four of us don't have these songs, who really does?" The band members thought that since there were enough lesser known songs to fill an entire album, it would be interesting to make a compilation album for these songs.

McIlrath described Long Forgotten Songs as "a trip down memory lane" for the band members and their fans. The album comprises twenty-six tracks that span nearly thirteen years, and includes various B-sides, covers, and different versions of existing Rise Against songs. Long Forgotten Songs is rooted in the band's signature hardcore punk and melodic hardcore sound, with lyrical themes ranging from relationships to politics. Among the album's covers include Bob Dylan's "Ballad of Hollis Brown", Journey's "Any Way You Want It", Nirvana's "Sliver", and Bruce Springsteen's "The Ghost of Tom Joad". The cover of "The Ghost of Tom Joad" in particular is a live recording from 2012, with MC5's Wayne Kramer, the Gaslight Anthem's Brian Fallon, and Rage Against the Machine's Tom Morello.

Some songs on Long Forgotten Songs were included as bonus tracks for previous Rise Against albums. For example, "Lanterns" was an iTunes bonus track for Endgame. Bassist Joe Principe explained how the song was a nod to the older sound of Rise Against, but its sound did not match the overall musical style of the album. He further explained that this was the reason why many of the songs on Long Forgotten Songs were chosen as B-sides; these songs did not fit the musical style or lyrical themes of the parent album.

== Release and reception ==
Professional ratings
Review scores
Source	Rating
AllMusic	3.5/5 stars
Kerrang!	4/5 stars
Metal Hammer	3/5 stars
Revolver	4/5 stars

Long Forgotten Songs was released on September 10, 2013. People who purchased the album from Best Buy received two additional cover tracks: "Fix Me" by Black Flag, and "Kick Out the Jams" by MC5. In the United States, the album debuted at number nineteen on the Billboard 200, and spent two weeks on the chart. Also in the United States, the album peaked at number four on the Top Alternative Albums chart, number two on the Top Hard Rock Albums chart, and number four on the Top Rock Albums. In the United Kingdom, Long Forgotten Songs reached number seventy-three on the Official Albums Chart and number seven on the Official Rock & Metal Albums Chart. Elsewhere, the album peaked at number sixteen in Australia, number seven in Austria, number four in Canada, number seven in Germany, number sixty-five in Scotland, and number thirty-three in Switzerland.

Long Forgotten Songs received generally favorable reviews. Revolver called the album "a surprisingly cohesive treasure trove", and highlighted the more unique cover songs such as "Little Boxes" and "The Ghost of Tom Joad". AllMusic and Metal Hammer wrote that although most B-side compilation albums are usually hit-or-miss, Long Forgotten Songs had enough fully fleshed out songs to warrant a purchase. Both publications also praised the covers, with AllMusic commenting how the covers give the listener insight into the bands that influenced Rise Against's music. Kerrang! wrote: "This isn't just a bunch of orphan songs lassoed together as a cash in...it's as fan-pleasing as it is necessary, containing some of their best work to date".

== Track listing ==
All tracks are written by Tim McIlrath unless otherwise stated.

No.	Title	Writer(s)	Original release	Length
1.	"Historia Calamitatum"		Punisher: War Zone soundtrack (2008)	3:23
2.	"Death Blossoms"		Appeal to Reason (2008) [Guitar Hero Bundle exclusive]	2:35
3.	"Elective Amnesia"		Appeal to Reason (iTunes exclusive)	3:55
4.	"Grammatizator"		Rise Against (2009)	2:10
5.	"Blind" (Face to Face cover)	Trever Keith	Rise Against / Face To Face split single (2011)	2:34
6.	"Everchanging (acoustic)"		Vans Warped Tour '06 (2006 Tour Compilation) (2006)	4:22
7.	"Generation Lost"		Join the Ranks EP (2011)	3:48
8.	"Dirt and Roses" (originally released on the Avengers Assemble soundtrack)		Avengers Assemble soundtrack (2012)	3:13
9.	"Ballad of Hollis Brown" (Bob Dylan cover)	Bob Dylan	Chimes of Freedom compilation (2012)	5:12
10.	"Sight Unseen"		Rise Against / Anti-Flag split single (2009)	3:56
11.	"Lanterns" (originally released as an iTunes exclusive for Endgame)		Endgame (2011) [iTunes exclusive]	3:52
12.	"Making Christmas" (Danny Elfman cover)	Danny Elfman	Nightmare Revisited compilation (2008)	3:27
13.	"Join the Ranks"		Fat Music Volume V: Live Fat, Die Young compilation (2001)	1:29
14.	"Built to Last" (Sick of It All cover)	Louis Koller; Pete Koller; Arman Majidi; Craig Setari	Our Impact Will Be Felt tribute album (2007)	1:55
15.	"Voice of Dissent"		Rise Against	2:00
16.	"Little Boxes" (Pete Seeger cover)	Malvina Reynolds	Weeds: Little Boxes Dimebag #1 (2007)	1:29
17.	"Give It All"		Rock Against Bush, Vol. 1 compilation (2004)	2:49
18.	"Minor Threat" (Minor Threat cover)	Brian Baker; Ian MacKaye; Jeffrey Nelson; Lyle Preslar	This Is Noise EP (2008)	1:40
19.	"Obstructed View"		The Only Constant Is Change compilation (2004)	2:04
20.	"But Tonight We Dance"		The Sufferer & the Witness (2006) [iTunes exclusive]	2:47
21.	"Nervous Breakdown" (Black Flag cover)	Greg Ginn	Lords of Dogtown: Music from the Motion Picture (2005)	2:09
22.	"Gethsemane"		Oil: Chicago Punk Refined compilation (2003)	2:30
23.	"Boy's No Good" (Lifetime cover)	Ari Katz; Dan Yemin; David Palaitis; Pete Martin; Scott Golley	This Is Noise EP	1:20
24.	"Any Way You Want It" (Journey cover)	Steve Perry; Neal Schon	Revolutions Per Minute (2003) [Vinyl exclusive hidden track]	2:57
25.	"Sliver" (Nirvana cover)	Kurt Cobain	Originally recorded for The A.V. Club's A.V. Undercover web series (2010)	2:04
26.	"The Ghost of Tom Joad" (live; Bruce Springsteen cover)	Bruce Springsteen	Previously unreleased (2012)	8:37
Total length:				78:17

Long Forgotten Songs: B-Sides & Covers 2000–2013 – Best Buy bonus tracks
No.	Title	Writer(s)	Original artist	Length
27.	"Fix Me"	Greg Ginn	Black Flag	0:54
28.	"Kick Out the Jams" (live)	Rob Tyner; Wayne Kramer; Fred "Sonic" Smith; Michael Davis; Dennis Thompson	MC5	7:08
Total length:				86:19

== Charts ==
Chart (2013)	Peak position
Australian Albums (ARIA)	16
Austrian Albums (Ö3 Austria)	7
Canadian Albums (Billboard)	4
German Albums (Offizielle Top 100)	7
Scotland Albums (OCC)	65
Swiss Albums (Schweizer Hitparade)	33
UK Albums (OCC)	73
UK Rock & Metal Albums (Official Charts)	7
US Billboard 200	19
US Top Alternative Albums (Billboard)	4
US Top Hard Rock Albums (Billboard)	2
US Top Rock Albums (Billboard)	4
