= Make It Stop (September's Children) =

2011 single by Rise Against

Single by Rise Against

from the album Endgame
- B-side: "Lanterns"
- Released: May 30, 2011
- Recorded: The Blasting Room (Fort Collins, Colorado)
- Genre: Punk rock; emo
- Length: 3:55
- Label: DGC; Interscope
- Songwriter: Rise Against
- Producers: Bill Stevenson; Jason Livermore

Rise Against singles chronology
"Help Is on the Way" (2011)	"Make It Stop (September's Children)" (2011)	"Satellite" (2011)

Audio sample
- Make It Stop (September's Children): file; help

"Make It Stop (September's Children)" is the second single from rock band Rise Against's sixth studio album, Endgame. The single was released to digital music outlets on May 30, 2011. The song hit radio stations the following day. It peaked at number six on Billboard's Alternative Songs chart and number eight on Billboard's Rock Songs chart. The song is part of the It Gets Better Project.

== Song meaning ==
In an article for Punknews.org, lead singer Tim McIlrath revealed that "a number of events were the catalyst for the creation of Make It Stop, everything from the suicides in September 2010, to our own fans voicing their fears and insecurities from time to time. I decided to create the song as a response, and when I discovered the It Gets Better campaign and [It Gets Better Project co-founder] Dan Savage's commitment to such an important and concise message, I was moved." McIlrath was also concerned that hard rock could be considered a vehicle for homophobia, as historically the genre has been LGBT-unfriendly, and wanted to make a song to counter such concerns.

The song explicitly deals with the bullying and harassment LGBT youth face. According to McIlrath, "The message is: It can get better, it does get better, give it a chance to get better, don't end your life prematurely."

Toward the end of the track, the first five of the nine names of the September 2010 suicides are read aloud: (Tyler Clementi, age 18; Billy Lucas, age 15; Harrison Chase Brown, age 15; Cody J. Barker, age 17; Seth Walsh, age 13). The last four names: Felix Sacco, age 17; Asher Brown, age 13; Caleb Nolt, age 14; and Raymond Chase, age 19, are read aloud over the course of the next two verses but are overshadowed by the main lyrics.

== Reception ==
"Make It Stop (September's Children)" received positive reviews from critics. Thomas Nassiff of AbsolutePunk wrote that despite its more accessible sound, "[the] song becomes an example of the way that radio-ready rock music should be written". Scott Heisel of Alternative Press noted that the song borrows the guitar opening from "Boulevard of Broken Dreams" by Green Day, but characterized the lyrics as "more pointed than Billie Joe Armstrong's have ever been". Davey Boy of Sputnikmusic described the children's choir and spoken names during the bridge as "effective devices employed to bring awareness to such a worthwhile issue". Conversely, Jason Heller of The A.V. Club criticized the children's choir, noting that it "sends the song flying into a tear-filled well of self-parody".

Commercially, "Make It Stop (September's Children)" reached several music charts, peaking at number eight on the Billboard Hot Rock Songs chart, number twelve on the Czech Republic Modern Rock chart, and number twenty-nine on the Mexico Ingles Airplay chart.

== Music video ==
In one scene, a teenage girl finds her locker covered in homophobic slurs, such as "dyke" and "fag".

The accompanying music video was directed by Marc Klasfeld and filmed at Rolling Meadows High School in Rolling Meadows, Illinois, the same school McIlrath attended as a student. The video was a collaboration with the It Gets Better Project, a nonprofit organization that aims to prevent suicide within the LGBT community.

The music video was nominated for the "Best Video with a Message" award at the 2011 MTV Video Music Awards, but lost to Born This Way by Lady Gaga.

== Charts ==
=== Weekly charts ===
Chart (2011)	Peak position
Canada Rock (Billboard)	18
Czech Republic (Modern Rock)	12
Mexico Ingles Airplay (Billboard)	29
US Hot Rock & Alternative Songs (Billboard)	8

=== Year-end charts ===
Chart (2011)	Position
US Hot Rock Songs (Billboard)	35
