= Wait for Me (Rise Against song) =

Promotional single by Rise Against

from the album Endgame
- Released: June 12, 2012
- Recorded: September 2010–January 2011
- Studio: The Blasting Room (Fort Collins, Colorado)
- Genre: Alternative rock
- Length: 3:39
- Label: DGC; Interscope
- Songwriter: Rise Against
- Producers: Bill Stevenson; Jason Livermore

"Wait for Me" is a song by American rock band Rise Against, featured on their sixth studio album Endgame (2011). The song impacted radio on June 12, 2012. Written by lead vocalist Tim McIlrath, the track is notable for being one of the slower songs off the album. It was released as a promotional single in 2012, and was the final single released for Endgame. The song received positive reviews, with praise for its slower and methodical nature. It reached number 14 on the US Rock Songs chart, and was featured on the "Best Songs of the year" lists by KROQ-FM and WSUN-FM.

== Background and composition ==
"Wait for Me" was written by lead vocalist Tim McIlrath in collaboration with the song's producers, Bill Stevenson and Jason Livermore. The latter two engineered the song alongside Andrew Berlin, while Chris Lord-Alge served as the mixer. It was recorded at The Blasting Room in Fort Collins, Colorado and mastered by Ted Jensen. McIlrath revealed it was his favorite track off Endgame, calling it a "fun song to put together".

"Wait for Me" is notable for being one of the slower tracks off the album. McIlrath described the song as "more ballad-esque". While not a fully-fledged acoustic track, bassist Joe Principe felt that the song "kept the record in balance with the heavier songs and the fast songs". He also noted that there was no push to write a slower song for the album, and that "Wait for Me" came naturally for the band. Lyrically, McIlrath poses several questions, including "Do you see the world in black and grey?" Adam R. Holz of Plugged In (publication) interpreted the lyrics as "a desperate man who grew up in a broken home pleads for someone not to give up on him".

== Reception and recognition ==
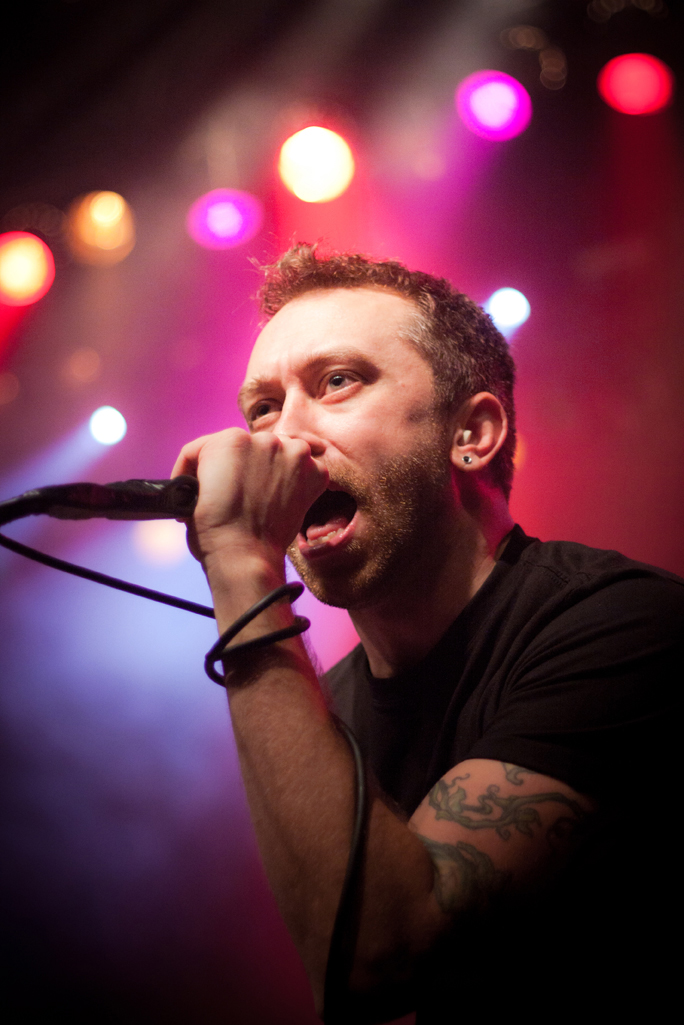
McIlrath's (pictured in 2011) vocals were praised.

The song received positive reviews from music critics. Thomas Nassiff of AbsolutePunk felt that "Wait for Me" and fellow Endgame track "This Is Letting Go" were able to "show that Rise Against can slow things down a little without becoming forgettable". Kiel Hauck of PopMatters labeled the song as "infectious", praising McIlrath's vocals and the guitar work of Zach Blair. Alex Young of Consequence of Sound noted the contrast between the subtlety of "Wait for Me" and the ferocity of "Broken Mirrors", later commenting on how the tracks "destroy whatever weaker points were left uncovered via Appeal to Reason".

Loudwire listed the "Wait for Me" one of the 20 best songs of the week of August 6–11, 2012. California radio-station KROQ-FM named "Wait for Me" as number 42 on their list of the 50 best songs of 2012, while WSUN-FM listed it as the 39th best song that year.

== Credits and personnel ==
Credits adapted from the liner notes of Endgame.

- Performed by Rise Against, with backing vocals by Chad Price
- Written by Tim McIlrath
- Produced by Bill Stevenson and Jason Livermore
- Recorded at The Blasting Room, Fort Collins, Colorado
- Audio engineering by Bill Stevenson, Jason Livermore, and Andrew Berlin
- Mixed by Chris Lord-Alge
- Mastered by Ted Jensen

== Charts ==
=== Weekly charts ===
Weekly chart performance for "Wait for Me"
Chart (2012)	Peak position
Canada Rock (Billboard)	50
US Hot Rock & Alternative Songs (Billboard)	14

=== Year-end charts ===
Year-end chart performance for "Wait for Me"
Chart (2012)	Position
US Hot Rock Songs (Billboard)	54
