= Help Is on the Way =

"Help Is On the Way"

Single by Rise Against

from the album Endgame
- Released: January 25, 2011
- Recorded: The Blasting Room (Fort Collins, Colorado)
- Genre: Punk rock
- Length: 3:57
- Label: DGC; Interscope
- Songwriter: Rise Against
- Producers: Bill Stevenson; Jason Livermore

Rise Against singles chronology
"Savior" (2009)	"Help Is On the Way" (2011)	"Make It Stop (September's Children)" (2011)

"Help Is On the Way" is a song by American rock band Rise Against, featured on their sixth studio album Endgame (2011). Inspired by lead vocalist Tim McIlrath's visit to New Orleans, the song is about the slow response time for aid to disaster stricken areas. It incorporates elements of punk rock and melodic hardcore, with lyrics that allude to Hurricane Katrina and the Deepwater Horizon oil spill. "Help Is On the Way" premiered on KROQ-FM on January 17, 2011, and was later released as Endgame's lead single on January 25.

"Help Is On the Way" polarized critics, with some praising its lyrics and song structure, while others criticized it for being bland and repetitive. Despite the mixed reception, it remains one of the band's highest-charting singles to date. It peaked at eighty-nine on the Billboard Hot 100, and reached number two on the Hot Rock Songs chart. The accompanying music video depicts a family, as they attempt to escape increasing floodwater levels that engulf their neighborhood.

== Composition ==
"Help Is on the Way"
A twenty-three second sample of "Help Is on the Way". In order to achieve a smooth transition between sections, small pauses of silence are utilized, such as at the 0:11 mark of this sample.

"Help Is on the Way" is a punk rock song. John Fortunato of The Aquarian Weekly described the song as a "menacingly anthemic, phlegm-clearing diatribe". "Help Is on the Way" is written in the time signature of common time, with a moderate tempo of 108 beats per minute. It is composed in the key G minor, with a melody that spans a tonal range of D_{4} to B♭_{5}.

Lyrically, "Help Is on the Way" is about the slow response time for aid to disaster stricken areas. During the first and second verses, the lyrics allude to Hurricane Katrina and the Deepwater Horizon oil spill, as well as their affects on the Gulf Coast of the United States and the city of New Orleans. Singer Tim McIlrath maintains clean vocals throughout the majority of the song, (Note: In rock music terminology, clean vocals are used in the context of aggressive music to differentiate singing from screaming or growling, which are called unclean vocals.) but temporarily switches to screaming vocals during the bridge.

McIlrath wrote the lyrics, which were inspired by a trip he took to New Orleans. While he had initially gone to discuss with local musicians how to merge politics with music, (Note: Rise Against is well known for their political activism, with many of their songs advocating social justice.) he was able to visit several areas affected by Hurricane Katrina and the subsequent flood, such as the Lower Ninth Ward. As McIlrath felt that news outlets were quick to discuss less important stories following the disaster, he compiled his thoughts and wrote the song's lyrics. McIlrath also noted his criticism of the United States government and how they handled these disasters influenced the lyrics; he called Hurricane Katrina "as much a man-made disaster as it was a natural disaster", and lambasted the fact that no legislation was passed to prevent another oil spill following the Deepwater Horizon oil spill.

== Release and reception ==
"Help Is on the Way" had its world premiere on the California radio-station KROQ-FM on January 17, 2011. It was then released on January 25, as the lead single from Rise Against's sixth album Endgame. Commercially, "Help Is on the Way" is one of Rise Against's most successful singles to date. In the United States, it remains the band's only song to reach the Billboard Hot 100, where it peaked at eighty-nine, and reached number two on the Hot Rock Songs chart. The single also achieved international success, reaching number ten on the Australia Hitseekers chart, number forty-five on the Canadian Hot 100, number four on the Czech Republic Modern Rock chart, and number nineteen on the UK Rock & Metal chart.

Critics were polarized in their opinions when reviewing "Help Is on the Way". Tim Newbound of Rock Sound described the piece as "impressively structured and equally furious", while Evan Lucy of Billboard thought it was "understated enough to capture radio attention and plenty explosive to please Rise Against's devoted fan base". Rob Parker of NME felt that "Help Is on the Way" and fellow Endgame track "This Is Letting Go" were able to "strike the perfect balance between punk fury and melodic accessibility without losing any of frontman Tim McIlrath’s personality". Chad Grischow of IGN complimented the music, saying that "as powerful as the lyrical content of the song is, the storm of guitars rolling over it like a gristly, foreboding cloud kick you in the chest just as hard".

Koski and Steven Hyden of The A.V. Club were divided in their opinions, with Koski praising the powerful lyrics, while Hyden belittled the song as "run-of-the-mill". Thomas Nassiff of AbsolutePunk wrote that "Help Is on the Way" was one of the weaker moments from the album, criticizing the intro guitar riff, while comparing the lyrics to those of another Rise Against song, "Re-Education (Through Labor)". Johnny Firecloud of CraveOnline was heavily critical of the song, stating that it "suffers from a blandness so paralyzing and repetitive", and ultimately summarized it as "totally flaccid".

== Music video ==
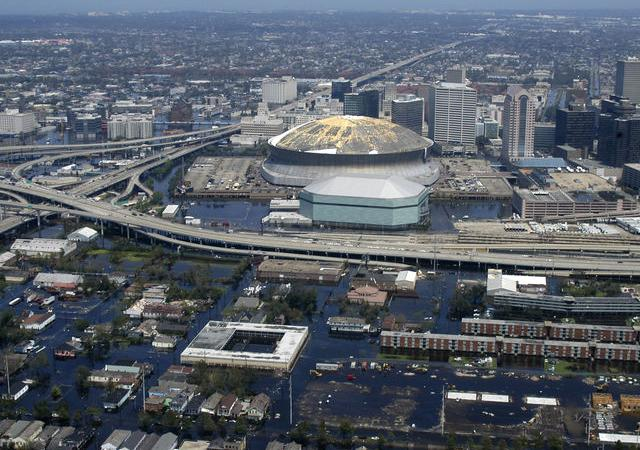
The music video depicts the flooding of New Orleans during Hurricane Katrina

The accompanying music video was directed by Alan Ferguson and filmed in New Orleans. It follows a family as they're forced to move into their house's attic, and eventually their rooftop to escape the increasing floodwater levels caused by Hurricane Katrina. The video follows the song's lyric thread, while real footage of Hurricane Katrina and the survivors are shown throughout. It ends with a message encouraging donations, and a link to the band's activism website.

The video was released on March 23, 2011. It does not feature any band members, who opted not to appear in it, as they felt their presence would be detrimental to the video's message. This decision was commended by critics, with Katie Hasty of HitFix stating that band "went for an artifact of truth".

== Credits and personnel ==
Credits adapted from the liner notes of Endgame.

=== Rise Against ===
- Tim McIlrath – lead vocals, rhythm guitar
- Zach Blair – lead guitar, backing vocals
- Joe Principe – bass guitar, backing vocals
- Brandon Barnes – drums

Additional backing vocals by Chad Price

=== Production ===
- Bill Stevenson, Jason Livermore – producers
- Bill Stevenson, Jason Livermore, Andrew Berlin – audio engineering
- Chris Lord-Alge – mixing
- Ted Jensen – mastering

== Charts ==
=== Weekly charts ===
Chart (2011)	Peak position
Australia Hitseekers (ARIA)	10
Canada (Canadian Hot 100)	45
Czech Republic (Modern Rock)	4
UK Rock and Metal (Official Charts Company)	19
US Billboard Hot 100	89
US Alternative Songs (Billboard)	2

=== Year-end charts ===
Chart (2011)	Position
US Alternative Songs (Billboard)	9
