= Tragedy + Time =

Single by Rise Against

from the album The Black Market
- Released: October 21, 2014
- Genre: Pop-punk
- Length: 4:17
- Label: Interscope
- Songwriter: Rise Against

Rise Against singles chronology
"I Don't Want to Be Here Anymore" (2014)	"Tragedy + Time" (2014)	"The Violence" (2017)

"Tragedy + Time" is a song by American punk rock band Rise Against. The song was released on October 21, 2014 as the second single from their seventh album, The Black Market. According to lead singer Tim McIlrath, its title comes from the phrase "tragedy plus time equals comedy". The song is a playable track in the video game Guitar Hero Live.

== Reception ==
Mischa Pearlman of Alternative Press praised the song's chorus, calling it "one of the band's most catchy, anthemic choruses". Max Qayyum of Punknews.org said that "despite being the poppiest song on the record", he found the track sincere and noted how it would work as the penultimate track. Ryan Bray of Consequence of Sound called the song "overlong but catchy". Dan H. of Sputnikmusic criticized the song for being "extraneous even amidst the variety".

== Music video ==
A lyric video was released for the song on October 21, 2014, followed by a music video on November 6.

== Charts ==
=== Weekly charts ===
Chart (2014–15)	Peak position
Canada Rock (Billboard)	47
US Rock & Alternative Airplay (Billboard)	24
US Alternative Airplay (Billboard)	26
US Mainstream Rock (Billboard)	28
