= House on Fire (Rise Against song) =

Single by Rise Against

from the album Wolves
- Released: January 9, 2018
- Studio: Rock Falcon Studios (Nashville, Tennessee)
- Length: 3:15
- Label: Virgin
- Songwriter: Tim McIlrath
- Producer: Nick Raskulinecz

Rise Against singles chronology
"The Violence" (2017)	"House on Fire" (2018)	"Broken Dreams, Inc." (2020)

"House on Fire" is a song by the American rock band Rise Against. The song was released on January 9, 2018 as the second single from their eighth studio album, Wolves. Originally made available as a pre-release buzz track on May 21, 2017, the song was written by lead singer Tim McIlrath about the perils of fatherhood.

== Composition ==
In an interview with Matt Pinfield on the 2 Hours with Matt Pinfield podcast, lead singer Tim McIlrath stated that "When you hear it you might hear a kind of classic love-and-loss-like love song... but the song actually is about becoming a parent. I like to think I have the world figured out, but once you throw a 13-year-old daughter your way you realize, I have nothing figured out. And this is an incredible challenge that's at the same time worth it."

Loudwire stated that the song was built around a "driving drum and guitar beat powering a majority of the song, allowing for the occasional pull back to let Tim McIlrath's raspy yet commanding vocals take the attention."

== Release ==
On January 9, 2018, "House on Fire" was officially sent for adds on alternative radio stations.

== Music video ==
On January 9, 2018, a music video for the song was also released. The video was directed by Daniel Carberry and revolves around a grandfather's love for his granddaughter. The granddaughter is gifted with the ability to control fire, which goes awry as her grandfather must venture through the fire in order to save her; the members of Rise Against make a cameo appearance at a café watching the news and helping the grandfather on his way. The video's press release states that it represents "the innocence of early childhood giving way to the tumultuous coming-of-age years" and "how personal relationships can also have an impact on our world."

== Charts ==
=== Weekly charts ===
Weekly chart performance for "House on Fire"
Chart (2018)	Peak position
Canada Rock (Billboard)	44
US Hot Rock & Alternative Songs (Billboard)	35
US Rock & Alternative Airplay (Billboard)	7

=== Year-end charts ===
Year-end chart performance for "House on Fire"
Chart (2018)	Position
US Rock Airplay (Billboard)	42
