= The Violence =

2017 single by Rise Against

Single by Rise Against

from the album Wolves
- Released: April 20, 2017
- Studio: Rock Falcon Studios (Nashville, Tennessee)
- Genre: Punk rock
- Length: 3:49
- Label: Virgin
- Producer: Nick Raskulinecz

Rise Against singles chronology
"Tragedy + Time" (2014)	"The Violence" (2017)	"House on Fire" (2018)

"The Violence" is a song by American rock band Rise Against. The song was released on April 20, 2017 as the lead single from their eighth studio album, Wolves. Inspired by the 2016 United States presidential election cycle, "The Violence" contains lyrics described by vocalist Tim McIlrath as being about "whether violence is an inevitability of the human condition, or whether it's a choice we make, and therefore, can reject." The song has charted on both Billboard's Alternative Songs chart and Mainstream Rock Songs chart.

== Lyrical themes ==
"The Violence" contains lyrics inspired by the 2016 United States presidential election cycle. In an interview with Kerrang!, vocalist Tim McIlrath stated that "As we were watching the news and seeing all the different things [unfold] around the planet, I realized that violence has such a role in a lot of what we see when the world is falling apart. The violence is a reflection of whether our [aggression] is in our nature, our DNA, or whether we have a choice to be part of it. And it is a choice that we make – a conscious one – to use violence as a means to an end. Aren't we better than this? Aren't we the apex of the animal kingdom? Aren't we the only ones on the planet that have the capacity for compassion? Aren't we good enough or brave enough to not sink to violence?"

== Music video controversy ==
On May 1, 2017, "The Violence" became enshrouded in controversy when it was revealed that the band was prohibited from shooting a music video due to being "anti-government". The plan originally called for Rise Against to perform the song in a field containing busts of all 43 United States presidents located on a privately owned farm in Croaker, Virginia, formerly the site of the deteriorating Presidents Park. The permit granting Rise Against the right to film on the property was rescinded by the farm's board of directors during filming as the "message" it sent was deemed too "anti-American".

Later that day, Rise Against posted a message on their Facebook page reading:

"As we prepare for the June 9th release of our new record WOLVES, we planned to shoot a video for the first single of that record "The Violence." The song talks about whether violence is an inevitability of the human condition, or whether it's a choice we make, and therefore, can reject. The video would attempt to distill this concept. Our director approached us with the idea of filming in a field full of the Presidential busts (basically the giant concrete heads of Roosevelt, Lincoln, Washington, etc). Our permit to shoot the video was initially granted, but subsequently pulled by the board of directors who oversee the location. The reason? They decided we were 'anti-government.' We found this location compelling as the President heads represent power on both sides of the aisle. Rise Against has unapologetically spoken truth to power.

Today, as the world celebrates May Day and the international fight for workers rights, we are reminded that over 100 years ago, workers, many of them immigrants, were told to sit down and shut up. We all now enjoy weekends, eight hour workdays, and other protections because they refused to listen to naysayers. Renewed attacks on the most vulnerable in the world in the year 2017 has strengthened our resolve. We plan on being unapologetically loud about it no matter who tells us to pipe down. In that respect, we wear the boards rejection as a badge of honor. We will just find another door to claw at…

WOLVES 6/9/2017"

In its place, a lyric video was released on May 7, 2017 instead.

== Reception ==
"The Violence" received mostly positive reviews from critics. Rolling Stone stated that the song was "packed with jagged guitar riffs and rumbling drums that combine with Tim McIlrath punchy vocals to create a furious tension that finally bursts with a soaring chorus." Loudwire noted that "People around the world are wondering about the state of punk rock in the Trump era. Will it gain massive amounts of support and traction like it did in the Bush years? We'll see how it all unfolds with Rise Against being one of the first prominent punk acts to release new material in 2017. Rise Against sound just like themselves with "The Violence," as frontman Tim McIlrath ramps up his distinctive vocal style over buzzing guitars and marching drum beats."

== Charts ==
=== Weekly charts ===
Weekly chart performance for "The Violence"
Chart (2017)	Peak position
Canada Rock (Billboard)	7
US Hot Rock & Alternative Songs (Billboard)	26
US Rock & Alternative Airplay (Billboard)	5

=== Year-end charts ===
Year-end chart performance for "The Violence"
Chart (2017)	Position
US Hot Rock Songs (Billboard)	60
US Rock Airplay (Billboard)	10
