= I Don't Want to Be Here Anymore =

Single by Rise Against

from the album The Black Market
- Released: June 10, 2014
- Genre: Melodic hardcore
- Length: 3:59
- Label: Interscope
- Songwriter: Rise Against

Rise Against singles chronology
"Satellite" (2012)	"I Don't Want to Be Here Anymore" (2014)	"Tragedy + Time" (2014)

"I Don't Want to Be Here Anymore" is a song by American rock band Rise Against. The song was released as the lead single from their seventh album, titled The Black Market on June 10, 2014, and was sent to radio the same day. It debuted at #22 on the Alternative Songs chart and peaked at #5 on the Mainstream Rock chart.

== Music video ==
A music video for the song was released on July 23, 2014. A lyric video for the song was released on June 10, 2014.

== Charts ==
=== Weekly charts ===
Weekly chart performance for "I Don't Want to Be Here Anymore"
Chart (2014)	Peak position
Australia (ARIA)	69
Canada (Canadian Hot 100)	92
UK Rock & Metal (OCC)	11
Canada Rock (Billboard)	5
US Hot Rock & Alternative Songs (Billboard)	21
US Rock & Alternative Airplay (Billboard)	10

=== Year-end charts ===
Year-end chart performance for "I Don't Want to Be Here Anymore"
Chart (2014)	Position
US Hot Rock Songs (Billboard)	58
US Rock Airplay (Billboard)	24
