= Satellite (Rise Against song) =

Single by Rise Against

from the album Endgame
- Released: November 1, 2011
- Recorded: September 2010–January 2011
- Studio: The Blasting Room (Fort Collins, Colorado)
- Genre: Melodic hardcore
- Length: 3:58
- Label: DGC; Interscope
- Songwriter: Rise Against
- Producers: Bill Stevenson; Jason Livermore

Rise Against singles chronology
"Make It Stop (September's Children)" (2011)	"Satellite" (2011)	"I Don't Want to Be Here Anymore" (2014)

"Satellite" is a song by American punk rock band Rise Against, featured on their sixth studio album Endgame (2011). Written by lead vocalist Tim McIlrath, "Satellite" is a melodic hardcore song expressing the idea that the band stood by their social and political beliefs, and that they would not conform to mainstream media. The song first premiered on March 4, 2011 in a webisode series detailing the recording process of Endgame, but was not released as the album's third single until November 1, 2011. The song impacted radio on the same day.

The song was positively received by critics and praised for its passionate lyrics.

== Background ==
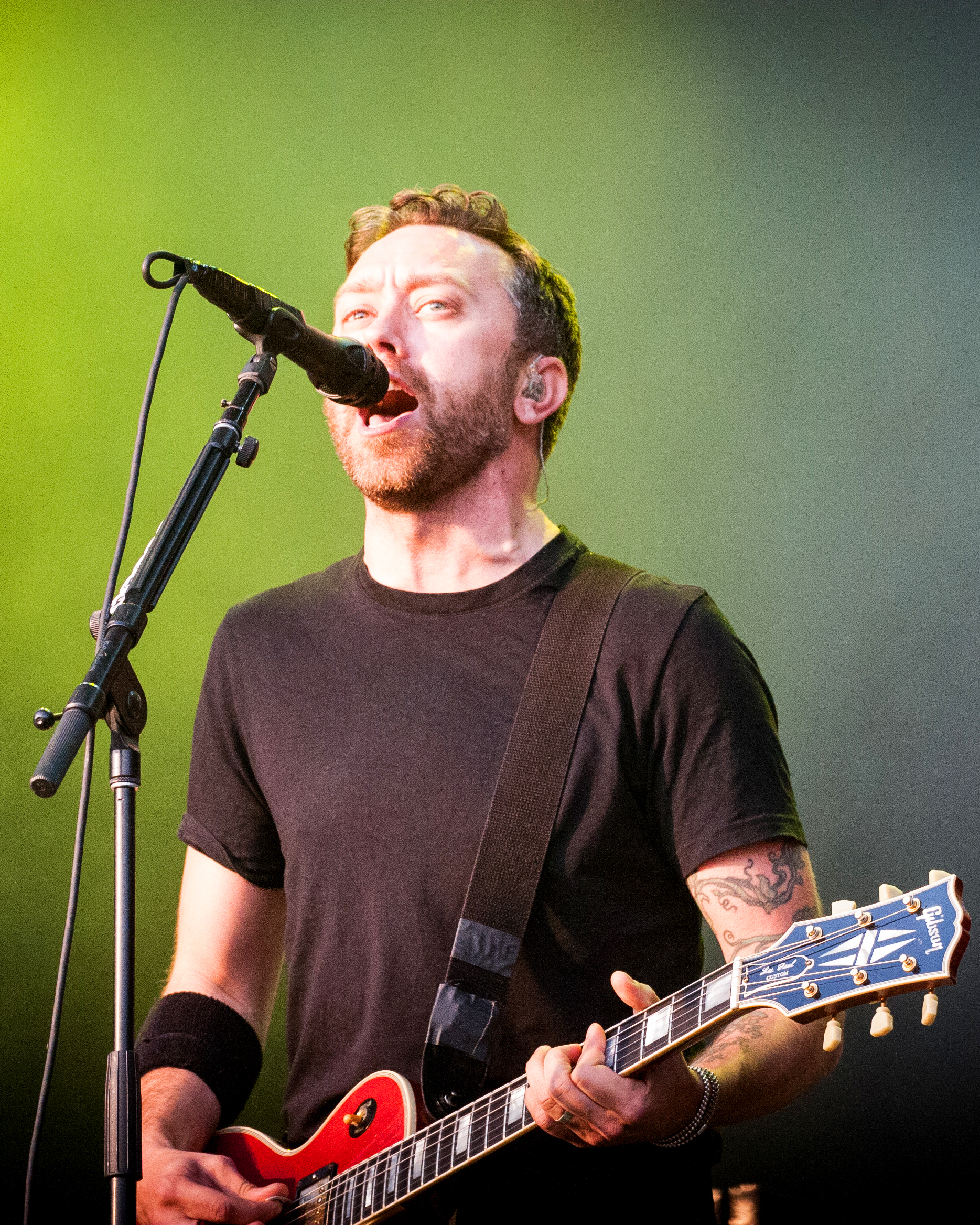
Tim McIlrath (pictured in 2015)

"Satellite" was written by lead vocalist Tim McIlrath in collaboration with the song's producers, Bill Stevenson and Jason Livermore. Stevenson and Livermore engineered the song alongside Andrew Berlin, while Chris Lord-Alge served as the mixer. It was recorded at The Blasting Room in Fort Collins, Colorado and mastered by Ted Jensen. Rise Against first unveiled the song on March 9, 2011 during a webisode documenting the studio recording sessions for Endgame. The band later released the track as the album's third and final single on November 1.

During the writing process for Endgame, McIlrath noted how he took inspiration from the song "Not Ready to Make Nice" by the country band The Chicks. "Not Ready to Make Nice" was written in response to a controversial statement made by Natalie Maines about then U.S. President George W. Bush. The lyrics for "Satellite" were inspired by the Dixie Chicks song. McIlrath also saw the song as a way of expressing that the band stood by their beliefs and that they wouldn't conform.

== Composition ==
"Satellite"
A 30 second sample of the song's chorus.

"Satellite" is a melodic hardcore song. John Fortunato of The Aquarian Weekly described the song as a "fist-pounding mantra", while Davey Boy of Sputnikmusic commented on how "Satellite" was produced to "enhance the [album's] melodic nature".

Lyrically, the song features several paradoxes and metaphors, such as "You can't fill your cup, until you empty all it has". According to McIlrath, the song's title comes from the idea that "Rise Against is kind of like a satellite and every once in a while we're in orbit over you - we pop into your lives and play show".

== Reception ==
The song was positively received by critics. Chad Grischow of IGN commented on the "melodic bliss hidden in the [song's] hammering riffs", and noted how "Satellite" and fellow Endgame track "This Is Letting Go" make the album a "tough resist for even those not accustomed to the staggering punk package it wraps it all up in". Boy labeled the song an "infectious sing-along" and praised the track for its fiery and passionate social commentary. Ulf Kubanke of laut.de found "Satellite" to be a perfect pop song, praising its anti-establishment message. However, Alex Young of Consequence of Sound described the song as one of the haphazard moments from the album, while John Gentile of Punknews.org felt that some of the lyrics were clichéd and bland.

== Music video ==
The accompanying music video was directed by Marc Klasfeld, and was released on November 1, 2011. Filmed during numerous Endgame Tour performances, the idea for the video stemmed from the distinct reaction by fans during live performances of the song. In response, the band felt compelled to dedicate the video to their fans. Alongside concert performances, several behind the scenes shots of the concert production crews are also shown.

A mashup video was produced, combining the music video with various motocross riders, including Blake Williams and Robbie Maddison.

== Credits and personnel ==
Credits adapted from the liner notes of Endgame.

=== Rise Against ===
- Tim McIlrath – lead vocals, rhythm guitar
- Zach Blair – lead guitar, backing vocals
- Joe Principe – bass guitar, backing vocals
- Brandon Barnes – drums

Additional backing vocals by Chad Price (All)

=== Production ===
- Bill Stevenson, Jason Livermore – producers
- Bill Stevenson, Jason Livermore, Andrew Berlin – audio engineering
- Chris Lord-Alge – mixing
- Ted Jensen – mastering

== Charts ==
=== Weekly charts ===
Weekly chart performance for "Satellite"
Chart (2012)	Peak position
Canada Rock (Billboard)	21
US Hot Rock & Alternative Songs (Billboard)	7

=== Year-end charts ===
Year-end chart performance for "Satellite"
Chart (2012)	Position
US Hot Rock Songs (Billboard)	32

== Certifications ==
Certifications and sales for "Satellite"
Region	Certification	Certified units/sales
Austria (IFPI Austria)	Platinum	30,000^{*}
Germany (BVMI)	Gold	150,000^{‡}
New Zealand (RMNZ)	Gold	15,000^{‡}
^{*} Sales figures based on certification alone.^{‡} Sales+streaming figures based on certification alone.
