= Give It All =

2004 single by Rise Against

Single by Rise Against

from the album Siren Song of the Counter Culture
- Released: October 12, 2004
- Studio: Plumper Mountain Sound (Gibsons, British Columbia); The Warehouse (Vancouver)
- Genre: Hardcore punk; melodic hardcore
- Length: 2:50
- Label: Geffen
- Composers: Brandon Barnes; Chris Chasse; Tim McIlrath; Joe Principe
- Lyricist: Tim McIlrath
- Producer: Garth Richardson

Rise Against singles chronology
| "Give It All" (2004) | "Swing Life Away" (2005) |

"Give It All" is a song by American rock band Rise Against. It was originally recorded for the 2004 compilation album Rock Against Bush, Vol. 1, while a slightly altered version appeared on the band's third studio album Siren Song of the Counter Culture later that year. It is a hardcore punk song, with lyrics that are about "being a punk rocker in today's world," according to lead vocalist Tim McIlrath. It was released as Siren Song of the Counter Culture's first single in October 2004.

Despite receiving minimal coverage from music critics who reviewed Siren Song of the Counter Culture, "Give It All" has become one of Rise Against's most widely recognized songs, and is credited as the band's breakthrough single. It has been featured on multiple lists of the best Rise Against songs, and peaked at number thirty-seven on the Billboard Alternative Songs chart. The accompanying music video has the band perform in a crowded subway car, while other people travel throughout the city of Chicago vandalizing and defacing billboards and posters, with the intention of raising social and political awareness.

== Background and composition ==
After spending several years as an underground band in which they released two albums with Fat Wreck Chords, Rise Against signed a recording contract with Geffen Records in 2003. (Note: Rise Against had originally signed with DreamWorks Records in 2003, but when DreamWorks Records folded into Geffen Records, the band was forced to switch labels.) This deal was criticized by some fans, who felt that a major record label would hinder the band's creative process and negatively impact their music. The first song the band released following their signing to Geffen was "Give It All", which was featured on the 2004 compilation album Rock Against Bush, Vol. 1. (Note: The Rock Against Bush, Vol. 1 version also appears on the 2013 compilation album Long Forgotten Songs: B-Sides & Covers 2000–2013.) The band liked the song, and decided to record a slightly altered version for their third studio album Siren Song of the Counter Culture later that year.

"Give It All" is a short hardcore punk track, with a fast pace and a slow bridge, and in the key of A major (although the verses, pre-chorus, and bridge start with F-sharp minor). Lead vocalist Tim McIlrath commented that the song is "kind of a punk rock anthem about being a punk rocker in today’s world; like what being a human being in today’s world is like." Scott Heisel of Punknews.org felt that the Rock Against Bush, Vol. 1 version maintained the band's distinctive sound, and signing to a major record label had not changed the band's music. Davey Boy of Sputnikmusic noted that the Siren Song of the Counter Culture version reminded him of a harder version of songs by the Offspring, and that it was controlled enough to appeal to casual rock fans.

== Reception ==
"Give It All"
A seventeen second sample of the Siren Songs of the Counter Culture version's chorus.

"Give It All" began playing on radio stations in October 2004, as the first single from Siren Song of the Counter Culture. Commercially, "Give It All" became the first Rise Against song to reach the Billboard Modern Rock Tracks chart, peaking at number thirty-seven on January 1, 2005.

Upon the release of Siren Song of the Counter Culture, "Give It All" received almost no coverage from music critics who reviewed the album, aside from Justin Donnelly of Blistering, who described the piece as "a little generic and forgettable". Despite the lack of coverage, it has become one of the band's most widely recognized songs, and John J. Moser of The Morning Call credits it as Rise Against's breakthrough single. Dave Kim of WGRD-FM listed "Give It All" as the fourth best Rise Against song.

== Music video ==
In the music video, Rise Against performs the song inside a crowded subway car.

The accompanying music video was directed by James Cox, and filmed in Chicago. In the video, Rise Against performs inside a subway car on the Chicago "L". Passengers begin boarding the car in large quantities, and engage in a mosh pit, while the band continues to perform. Simultaneously, other passengers leave the car and travel throughout the city at night, vandalizing and defacing billboards and posters with the intention of raising social and political awareness. In the morning, the vandals change into suits, and go to work.

The band was given a small budget to film the music video. McIlrath remarked that the band did not want to make a video that felt "really cheesy or overproduced", and instead wanted to incorporate the song's message. The night before filming began, the band performed at a local venue, and asked the audience members to star in the video; several audience members came the following day. The subway car featured in the video continued to make its regular stops, while the band and the actors performed. During one scene in the video, the vandals sneak into the local zoo, and deface a tiger cage with a sticker that says "I've spent my entire life trapped in a cage". The zoo had not given permission for the band to film the tiger cage, out of fear it would damage their reputation. The filming crew chose to instead sneak into the zoo at night to film the scene.

== Credits and personnel ==
Credits adapted from the liner notes of Siren Song of the Counter Culture.

=== Rise Against ===
- Tim McIlrath – lead vocals
- Chris Chasse – lead guitar, backing vocals
- Joe Principe – bass guitar, backing vocals
- Brandon Barnes – drums

Additional personnel

- Neil Hennessy - additional backing vocals

=== Production ===
- Garth Richardson – producer
- Dean Maher – audio engineering
- Andy Wallace – mixing

== Charts ==
| Chart (2005) | Peak position |
|---|---|
| US Alternative Songs (Billboard) | 37 |
