= Evertune =

American guitar bridge company

EverTune
- Company type: Private
- Industry: Musical instruments
- Headquarters: Los Angeles, California, U.S.
- Area served: Global
- Key people: Cosmos Lyles, Mark Chayet, Paul Dowd
- Products: Guitar bridges
- Website: Evertune.com

EverTune is an American company that produces the EverTune bridge, designed to keep guitar strings in tune.

== Background ==
Bending strings during an electric guitar solo can change a string's tension, causing it to go out of tune.

Stringed instruments, particularly guitars, have a tendency to get out of tune during playing, especially if strings are bent. In the late 1980s, Gibson developed a system called the Gibson Robot Guitar which used an onboard computer, motors, and a battery to keep the instrument in tune, but the system was complex and did not gain much marketplace acceptance, according to one report.

Guitarist and engineering student Cosmos Lyles came up with a device to keep his guitar in tune, and with the help of engineer Paul Dowd produced a prototype of the EverTune bridge, which uses a spring and lever system that maintains string tension.

== Invention ==
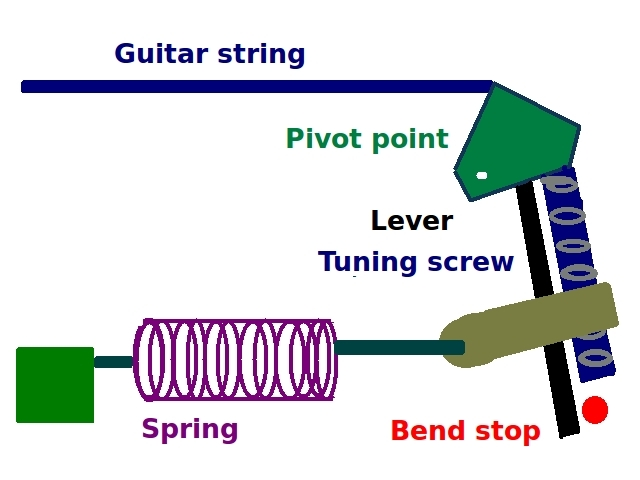
The EverTune mechanism keeps a string's tension constant by using a spring and lever system.

The EverTune bridge keeps a guitar in tune despite changes in tension. The mechanical device maintains a constant state of tension despite changes in temperature or humidity or the exertion of pressure on the string.

On a guitar, the bridge has six springs and levers, one for each of a guitar's six strings, such that "when a string stretches or slips, the springs apply the opposing force necessary to compensate for the shift, thus maintaining the correct tension and tuning." In theory, the device can work with any stringed instrument, according to the inventors. The mechanism has been patented. A guitar with one installed is no longer tuned by turning the pegs at the end of the guitar's neck but rather with a screw on the bridge.

== Marketing ==
The chief executive officer is Mark Chayet who had previously founded a manufacturing firm named Evermark which made CDs and DVDs. Chayet provided some of the initial financing for the firm, and other executives and entrepreneurs include David Weiderman, William Quigley, and Brock Pierce. The firm raised $800,000 in cash in May 2010, according to one report. One of the first guitars to have an EverTune bridge fitted in the factory is the VGS Radioactive TD-Special, a Tommy Denander signature guitar that was created by the German luthiers of VGS. The EverTune bridge has hit the market in North America in October 2010 but the first series is by installation only. The unit was displayed at the Consumer Electronics Show in 2010. The product was highlighted in a feature in The New York Times entitled The Year in Ideas. In August 2011, the product was not yet ready for sale. One report suggested that EverTune will be available on a "wide range of electric guitars" in the near future and will be available as an installation kit. Another report suggested there were 35 guitars with EverTune installed or about to be retrofitted with them. There are talks with guitar makers of electric guitars and basses to have the device embedded into new models and it is featured on the Ola Englund signature series of Washburn Guitars.
