= Lords of Dogtown (soundtrack) =

Lords of Dogtown: Music from the Motion Picture

Soundtrack album by various artists
- Released: May 24, 2005
- Genre: Rock
- Length: 1:09:01
- Label: Geffen
- Producers: Lia Vollack; Paul Kremen

Professional ratings
Review scores
Source	Rating
AllMusic	3.5/5 stars
Rolling Stone	3.5/5 stars

Lords of Dogtown: Music from the Motion Picture is the soundtrack album to Catherine Hardwicke's 2005 biographical drama film Lords of Dogtown. It was released on May 24, 2005 via Geffen Records. The soundtrack was produced by Lia Vollack and Paul Kremen and supersived by Liza Richardson. In the United States, the album peaked at number 99 on the Billboard 200 chart.

== Track listing ==
No.	Title	Writer(s)	Producer(s)	Length
1.	"Death or Glory" (performed by Social Distortion)	Joe Strummer; Mick Jones; Paul Simonon; Topper Headon	Mike Ness	3:31
2.	"Hair of the Dog" (performed by Nazareth)	Peter Agnew; Manuel Charlton; Dan McCafferty; Darrell Sweet		4:09
3.	"I Just Want to Make Love to You" (performed by Foghat)	Willie Dixon		4:20
4.	"Fox on the Run" (performed by Sweet)	Brian Connolly; Stephen Priest; Andrew Scott; Michael Tucker		3:22
5.	"Motor City Madhouse" (performed by Ted Nugent)	Ted Nugent		4:31
6.	"Turn to Stone" (performed by Joe Walsh)	Joe Walsh; Terry N. Trabandt		5:14
7.	"One Way Out" (performed by The Allman Brothers Band)	Elmore James; Marshall E. Sehorn; Sonny Boy Williamson		4:58
8.	"Fire" (performed by Jimi Hendrix)	Jimi Hendrix	Chas Chandler	2:43
9.	"Space Truckin'" (performed by Deep Purple)	Jon Lord; Ian Paice; Ian Gillan; Roger Glover; Ritchie Blackmore		4:32
10.	"Success" (performed by Iggy Pop)	David Bowie; Iggy Pop; Ricky Gardiner		4:23
11.	"Suffragette City" (performed by David Bowie)	Bowie		3:25
12.	"Iron Man" (performed by Black Sabbath)	John Osbourne; Tony Iommi; Terence Butler; William Ward		5:54
13.	"Nervous Breakdown" (performed by Rise Against)	Greg Ginn	Bill Stevenson; Jason Livermore	2:07
14.	"20th Century Boy" (performed by T. Rex)	Marc Bolan		3:39
15.	"Maggie May" (performed by Rod Stewart)	Rod Stewart; Martin Quittenton		5:15
16.	"Wish You Were Here" (performed by Sparklehorse)	David Gilmour; Roger Waters		6:58
Total length:				1:09:01

Songs that were featured in the movie but not on the soundtrack album

- "Half-Breed" by Cher
- "Cat Scratch Fever" by Ted Nugent
- "Old Man" by Neil Young
- "Voodoo Chile" by The Jimi Hendrix Experience
- "Steppin' Razor" by Peter Tosh
- "Daydream" by Robin Trower
- "Loose" by The Stooges
- "Jackie Blue" by Ozark Mountain Daredevils
- "Long Way to Go" by Alice Cooper
- "Shambala" by Three Dog Night
- "Sidewalk Surfin'" by Jan & Dean
- "Walking in Rhythm" by The Blackbyrds
- "The Red and the Black" by Blue Öyster Cult
- "Mongoloid" by Devo
- "Too High" by Stevie Wonder
- "Brandy (You're a Fine Girl)" by Looking Glass
- "Super Stupid" by Funkadelic
- "Crash Course in Brain Surgery" by Budgie
- "Fire" by Ohio Players
- "Stay With Me" by Faces
- "T.V. Eye" by The Stooges
- "Strange Brew" by Cream
- "Also Sprach Zarathustra" by Eumir Deodato
- "Solitary Confinement" by The Weirdos
- "Boulevard of Broken Dreams" by Green Day (featured only in the movie trailer)
- "No Reason" by Sum 41 (featured only in TV commercials for the movie)

== Charts ==
Chart (2005)	Peak position
US Billboard 200	99
