= Endgame (Rise Against album) =

Studio album by Rise Against
- Released: March 15, 2011
- Recorded: September 2010 – January 2011
- Studio: The Blasting Room (Fort Collins, Colorado)
- Genre: Melodic hardcore
- Length: 46:05
- Labels: DGC; Interscope
- Producers: Bill Stevenson; Jason Livermore

Rise Against chronology
Appeal to Reason (2008)	Endgame (2011)	Long Forgotten Songs: B-Sides & Covers 2000–2013 (2013)

Singles from Endgame
- 1. "Help Is on the Way" Released: January 25, 2011; 2. "Make It Stop (September's Children)" Released: May 30, 2011; 3. "Satellite" Released: November 1, 2011; 4. "Wait for Me" Released: June 12, 2012

Endgame is the sixth studio album by American punk rock band Rise Against. It was released on March 15, 2011, by DGC Records and Interscope Records. A melodic hardcore album, Endgame continues the trend by Rise Against towards more crisp, polished production, which began with the band's previous album Appeal to Reason. Social and political commentary constitute the majority of the lyrical content on Endgame, and a major theme revolves around the end of humanity.

After a lengthy tour in support of Appeal to Reason, Rise Against began recording Endgame in September 2010, with producers Bill Stevenson and Jason Livermore. Endgame debuted at number two on the Billboard 200, with 85,000 copies sold in its first week. It holds the record for the band's highest position on the chart. The album also charted highly in several other countries such as Canada, where it became Rise Against's second consecutive album to reach number one on the Canadian Albums Chart.

Three songs from Endgame were released as singles: "Help Is on the Way", "Make It Stop (September's Children)", and "Satellite". All three songs appeared on various Billboard charts, in particular "Help Is on the Way", which became Rise Against's only song to reach the Billboard Hot 100. Critical appraisal was mainly positive, with reviewers complimenting the music, and Rise Against's ability to integrate its hardcore punk roots with a mainstream rock sound. Most reviewers liked the politically driven lyrics, although some felt the lyrics were either lacking or melodramatic.

== Background and recording ==
In 2008, Rise Against released its fifth studio album, Appeal to Reason. It was the band's highest charting album on the Billboard 200, where it peaked at number three. Despite sales of nearly 500,000 copies, critics were divided in their opinions of the album. To promote the album, Rise Against embarked on the Appeal To Reason Tour, which concluded in mid-2010 with performances at several European festivals. That September, the band members reconvened at the Blasting Room in Fort Collins, Colorado to record Endgame.

Bassist Joe Principe noted that although the band members booked the Blasting Room six months in advance, they left for the studio later than expected. Once they arrived, the band members wrote and finalized song ideas Principe and lead vocalist Tim McIlrath had written while on tour. This writing process took place over a three-week period before recording. Principe said the members were underprepared once they entered the studio, and described the writing process as "a race-the-clock kind of thing". Endgame was produced by Bill Stevenson and Jason Livermore, the duo that produced three of Rise Against's last four albums.

== Composition ==
=== Music and lyrics ===
Endgame is a melodic hardcore album, with songs that feature aggressive movements, catchy hooks, and rapid drumming. Consequence of Sound's Alex Young described the music as "the missing link between Propaghandi-esque brutality and the easily consumed energy of something along NOFX lines". Endgame continues a trend by Rise Against towards a more polished sound. Gregory Heaney of AllMusic wrote the change in sound was more of a logical progression as opposed to selling out, a sentiment which was shared by Kiel Hauck of PopMatters. Hauck further stated that while the music featured in Endgame is more aggressive than the music in Appeal to Reason, it still maintains the polished sound they had previously achieved.

"Help Is on the Way"
A twenty-three second sample of "Help Is on the Way". Like many songs on Endgame, "Help Is on The Way" is rooted in melodic hardcore, and features lyrics that revolve around social and political commentary.

Social and political commentary constitute the majority of the lyrical content on Endgame. The main theme of the album revolves around the end of humanity. When asked about the lyrics, McIlrath said: "Every day, there's news about our financial system or the environment collapsing or stories about nuclear proliferation". Instead of writing cynical songs however, McIlrath took a more positive approach. "We're looking at Endgame from the perspective of, 'What if this is a good thing? What if this grotesque world we created doesn't deserve to go on? What if the place on the other [side] of this transition is [a] place we'd all rather be living in?'"

Andrew David King of PopMatters expanded upon these statements, commenting how the album's lyrics tell of a frustrated generation, from creation to demise. He wrote how the lyrics "personify the anger beneath modern malaise, and document what happens when the inability to discern right from wrong collides with the desire to do so." He also wrote how Endgame is a partial re-interpretation of the Book of Job, with songs about theodicy and revolution.

=== Songs ===
The first song on Endgame is "Architects", which has a fast tempo described by one critic as "a rapidly draining fuse running toward the explosion". The song features the lines "Don't you remember when you were young / and you wanted to set the world on fire / somewhere deep down I know you do", which are similar to lyrics found the Against Me! song "I Was a Teenage Anarchist". Some critics felt Rise Against was calling out Against Me! for fake passion, while other critics felt the lyrics were more focused on general apathy from the public. The second song, "Help Is on the Way", is about the slow response time for providing disaster relief, with lyrics that allude to Hurricane Katrina and the Deepwater Horizon oil spill. McIlrath maintains clean vocals throughout the majority of the song, (Note: In rock music terminology, clean vocals are used in the context of aggressive music to differentiate singing from screaming or growling, which are called unclean vocals.) but temporarily switches to screaming vocals during the bridge.

Critics wrote how "Make It Stop (September's Children)" best exemplified Rise Against's musical shift toward a more mainstream sound. It begins with a delayed guitar and a chorus of children, and transitions into a more pop punk-driven melody. The lyrics decry homophobia and bullying among LGBT youth, with a spoken word section that features the names of teenagers who committed suicide due to bullying. According to McIlrath, "Disparity by Design" is about "holding people accountable for their actions. It's a novel idea...to hold their feet to the fire". John Gentile of Punknews also noted the themes of economic injustice in the lyrics. The fifth song, "Satellite", was written as a way of expressing that Rise Against would continue to stand by their beliefs and not conform. McIlrath took inspiration from the Dixie Chicks song "Not Ready to Make Nice", which in turn was based on the events after lead vocalist Natalie Maines said that the band was ashamed that then-United States President George W. Bush was from Texas.

"Midnight Hands" is the longest song on the album, and features heavy metal-influenced guitar riffs. John Fortunato of The Aquarian Weekly offered his interpretation of the lyrics, calling the song "a radical, working class, pilgrimage saluting hard-won freedom". Bassist Joe Principe says the seventh song, "Survivor Guilt", serves as an extension of their 2008 song "Hero of War", and tells of the harsh realities a soldier experiences during war. "Broken Mirrors" is another heavy metal influenced song, with lyrics revolving around the days before Judgement Day. The ninth song, "Wait for Me", is one of the slower songs on the album, which McIlrath described as "more ballad-esque". "A Gentleman's Coup" continues on the theme of Judgment day presented in "Broken Mirrors", with the topic of nuclear annihilation.

"This Is Letting Go", is one of the more melody driven songs on the album, with a consistent flow. The lyrics tell of both romantic discontent and letting go of a preconceived direction to pursue one's own desires. McIlrath wrote the song with a character in mind, who is following his parents' dreams, but eventually tells them "It's not mine, it's yours". The final song, "Endgame", concludes the apocalyptic imagery saga from "Broken Mirrors" and "A Gentleman's Coup". In the song, Judgement Day came, and the remaining survivors wonder progress has been made toward restoring peace and order, or if humanity is doomed to extinction.

== Release and promotion ==
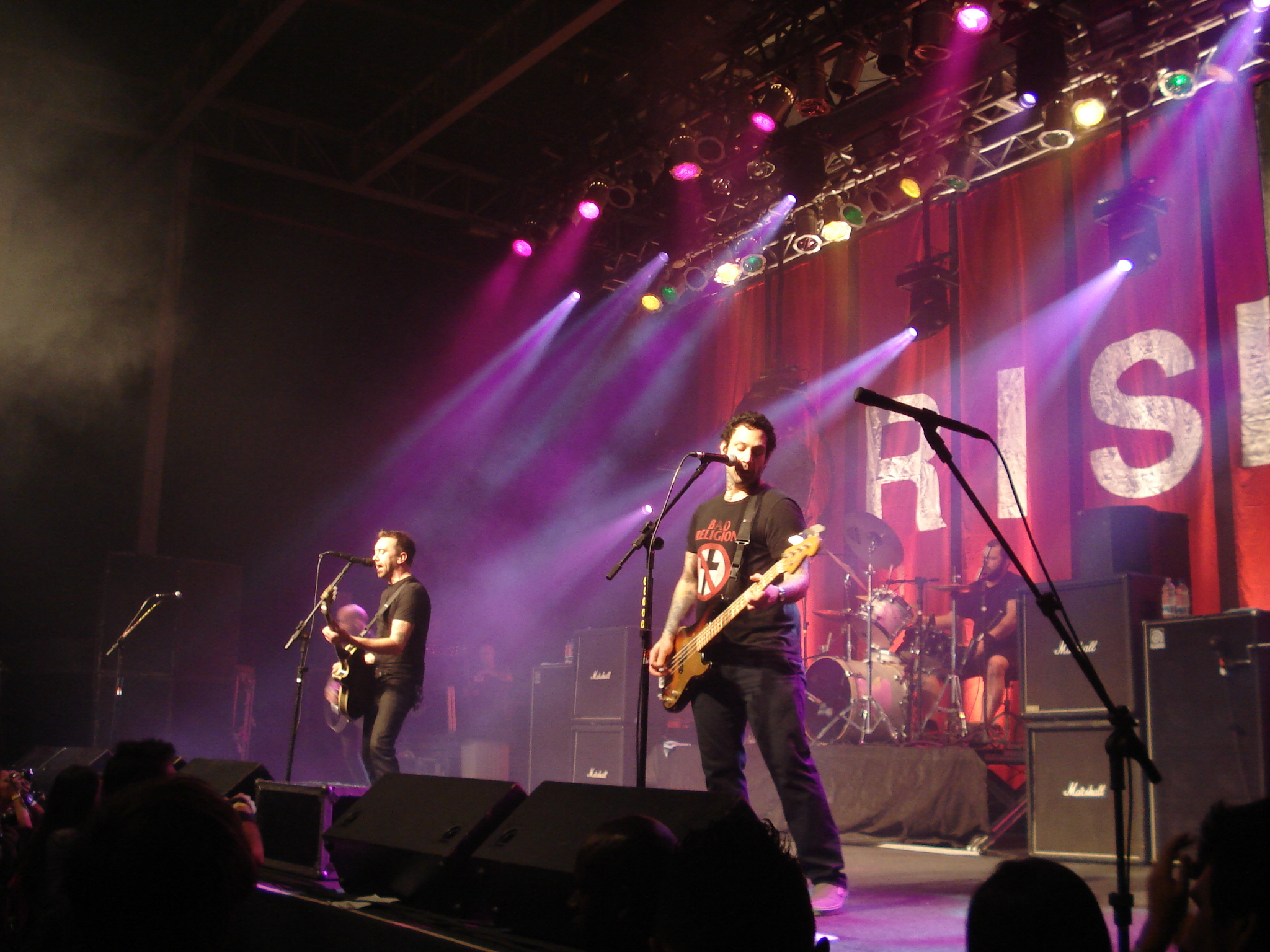
Rise Against playing on the Endgame tour on February 25, 2011, in Curitiba.

Endgame was released on March 15, 2011, and debuted at number two on the Billboard 200 chart, with 85,000 copies sold in its first week. It remains Rise Against's highest position on the chart. Endgame fell to number twenty-two the following week, with an additional 21,000 copies sold. Elsewhere on Billboard charts, Endgame topped the Top Rock Albums and the Top Hard Rock Albums charts, becoming the band's first album to do so on either chart. On the Canadian Albums Chart, Endgame became Rise Against's second consecutive number-one album. It was certified platinum by Music Canada in 2012, denoting shipments of more than 80,000 copies. Endgame found success on other charts outside of North America, such as number two in Australia, number one in Germany, and number six in Sweden.

Three songs from Endgame were released as singles: "Help Is on the Way", "Make It Stop (September's Children)", and "Satellite". "Help Is on the Way" in particular became one of Rise Against's most commercially successful singles. It is the band's only single to appear on the Billboard Hot 100, where it peaked at number eighty-nine. "Help Is on the Way" also reached number forty-five on the Canadian Hot 100, number two on both the Hot Rock Songs and Alternative Songs charts, and number six on the Mainstream Rock chart. "Make It Stop (September's Children)" and "Satellite" were also commercially successful on the Billboard rock charts, reaching the top ten on both the Hot Rock Songs and Alternative Songs charts.

Accompanying music videos were shot for the three singles. The video for "Help Is on the Way" plays on the natural disaster themes found in the lyrics, as it depicts an African-American family attempting to escape increasing floodwater levels that engulf their neighborhood. It ends with a message encouraging donations, and a link to the band's activism website. In the "Make It Stop (September's Children)" video, three gay teenagers are bullied, and contemplate suicide, before they realize they have much to live for. Rise Against partnered with the It Gets Better Project, and the video was filmed at McIlrath's alma mater Rolling Meadows High School. The video for "Satellite" features behind the scenes footage of production crews setting up the stage, soundchecks, and shots of fans at Rise Against concerts.

== Critical reception ==
Professional ratings
Aggregate scores
Source	Rating
Metacritic	76/100
Review scores
Source	Rating
AbsolutePunk	78%
AllMusic	3.5/5 stars
Alternative Press	4/5 stars
Consequence of Sound	C+
Entertainment Weekly	B
NME	8/10
PopMatters	7/10 stars
Rock Sound	9/10
Rolling Stone	3/5 stars
Spin	5/10
Sputnikmusic	4/5

Endgame currently holds a 76/100 on the review aggregator website Metacritic, which indicates "generally favorable reviews". Tim Newbound of Rock Sound wrote "'Endgame is bona fide awesomeness", while Stephen Thomas Erlewine of AllMusic said "Rise Against deliver another blast of driving, politically charged, melodic hardcore". NME's Rob Parker opined that while it was not as good as the 2003 album Revolutions per Minute, he called Endgame "a hugely exhilarating album ... a fine record from an ever-impressive band. Jon Dolan Rolling Stone commented "Rise Against's mastery of anthemic punk rock is second only to their mastery of being pissed off." Kenny Herzog of Spin wrote a more critical review of Endgame, in which he described most of the songs as "turgidly overlong and underfed".

Newbound called Endgame one of the most punk inspired albums Rise Against had ever recorded, and wrote: "it's an album drenched in hugely anthemic, melodic movements that could bring stadium crowds to a frenzy while never deviating from a punk blueprint." Consequence of Sound's Alex Young commented how the music would satisfy listeners who wanted hardcore movements with a straight edge dynamic, as well as casual listeners who simply want a steady rhythm to mosh to. Writing for AbsolutePunk, Thomas Nassiff liked how nearly every song had a catchy and memorable chorus rooted in punk, but said how the formula ultimately became repetitive. Davey Boy of Sputnikmusic criticized the indistinguishable sound of the album, which believed was due to guitarist Zach Blair's use of recycled guitar licks and riffs.

Several critics noted Rise Against's continued trend toward a more accessible and radio-friendly sound. Kiel Hauck of PopMatters wrote: "they're not reinventing the wheel here, only tinkering with the formula that's gotten them to where they are in the first place." Young said although Rise Against may never return to its hardcore roots, this was not selling out, but is instead "expanding the horizon to broaden who receives the calling". Nassiff felt the band lost some of its passion with the move toward a more accessible sound, but ultimately noted how many of the songs on the album were still better than most mainstream rock songs. "Listeners are lucky that Rise Against can still create a worthwhile and entertaining record while their music moves beyond its origins" said Nassiff.

Most critics liked the politically driven lyrics. Erlewine felt the lyrics provided listeners with an honest depiction of the world, and were often about topics listeners needed to hear as opposed to what they wanted to hear. Boy described the lyrics as passionate and motivated, regardless of the listener's political beliefs. Writing for Entertainment Weekly, Greg Kot found some of the lyrics to be overly melodramatic, while Hauck felt the lyrics would not have a lasting impact on the listener. Scott Heisel of Alternative Press praised the lyrics, and wrote: "that's really why Rise Against are so important to rock on a large spectrum these days, and why it's a relief that they made an album as strong as their ethics and beliefs this time around."

== Track listing ==
All lyrics written by Tim McIlrath; all music composed by Rise Against.

No.	Title	Length
1.	"Architects"	3:42
2.	"Help Is on the Way"	3:57
3.	"Make It Stop (September's Children)"	3:55
4.	"Disparity by Design"	3:49
5.	"Satellite"	3:59
6.	"Midnight Hands"	4:18
7.	"Survivor Guilt"	4:00
8.	"Broken Mirrors"	3:55
9.	"Wait for Me"	3:40
10.	"A Gentlemen's Coup"	3:46
11.	"This Is Letting Go"	3:41
12.	"Endgame"	3:24
Total length:		46:05

iTunes Store bonus track
No.	Title	Length
13.	"Lanterns"	3:49
Total length:		49:54

Australian bonus track
No.	Title	Length
13.	"The Good Left Undone" (live)	3:02
Total length:		49:07

== Personnel ==
Credits adapted from the liner notes of Endgame.

Rise Against

- Tim McIlrath – lead vocals, rhythm guitar
- Joe Principe – bass guitar, backing vocals
- Brandon Barnes – drums, percussion
- Zach Blair – lead guitar, backing vocals

Additional musicians

- Chad Price – backing vocals
- Matt Skiba – backing vocals on "Midnight Hands"
- Miles Stevenson, Maddie Stevenson, Stacie Stevenson, Jade Reese, Kaullin Sigward, and Tess Young – backing vocals on "Make It Stop (September's Children)"

Production

- Bill Stevenson – producer, engineering
- Jason Livermore – producer, engineering
- Andrew Berlin – engineering
- Chris Lord-Alge – mixing
- Ted Jensen – mastering
- Nik Karpen and Keith Armstrong – assisted mixing
- Brad Townsend and Andrew Shubert – additional engineering

== Charts ==
=== Weekly charts ===
Weekly chart performance for Endgame
Chart (2011)	Peak position
Australian Albums (ARIA)	2
Austrian Albums (Ö3 Austria)	3
Belgian Albums (Ultratop Flanders)	23
Belgian Albums (Ultratop Wallonia)	75
Canadian Albums (Billboard)	1
Dutch Albums (Album Top 100)	47
Finnish Albums (Suomen virallinen lista)	42
German Albums (Offizielle Top 100)	1
New Zealand Albums (RMNZ)	6
Norwegian Albums (VG-lista)	28
Scottish Albums (Official Charts)	22
Spanish Albums (Promusicae)	72
Swedish Albums (Sverigetopplistan)	6
Swiss Albums (Schweizer Hitparade)	12
UK Albums (Official Charts)	27
UK Rock & Metal Albums (Official Charts)	1
US Billboard 200	2
US Top Rock Albums (Billboard)	1
US Top Hard Rock Albums (Billboard)	1

=== Year-end charts ===
Year-end chart performance for Endgame
Chart (2011)	Position
Australian Albums (ARIA)	84
US Billboard 200	159
US Top Rock Albums (Billboard)	30

== Certifications ==
Certifications and sales for Endgame
Region	Certification	Certified units/sales
Australia (ARIA)	Gold	35,000^{^}
Austria (IFPI Austria)	Platinum	20,000^{*}
Canada (Music Canada)	Platinum	80,000^{^}
Germany (BVMI)	Platinum	200,000^{‡}
New Zealand (RMNZ)	Gold	7,500^{‡}
^{*} Sales figures based on certification alone.^{^} Shipments figures based on certification alone.^{‡} Sales+streaming figures based on certification alone.

== Release history ==
Release dates and formats for Endgame
Country	Date	Format	Label	Ref.
Australia	March 11, 2011	LP	Universal Music Group	
Germany	March 11, 2011	CD	Universal Music Group	
Poland	March 11, 2011	CD	Universal Music Group	
United Kingdom	March 14, 2011	CD	Polydor	
Portugal	March 14, 2011	CD	Universal Music Group	
Canada	March 15, 2011	CD	Universal Music Group	
France	March 15, 2011	CD	Universal Music Group	
France	March 15, 2011	LP	Universal Music Group	
Japan	March 15, 2011	CD	Universal Music Group	
United States	March 15, 2011	CD	Universal Music Group	
United States	March 15, 2011	LP	Universal Music Group	
United States	March 15, 2011	Digital download	Universal Music Group	
Australia	March 24, 2011	CD	Universal Music Group	
