= Swing Life Away =

Single by Rise Against

from the album Siren Song of the Counter Culture
- Released: April 25, 2005
- Studio: Plumper Mountain Sound; (Gibsons, British Columbia); The Warehouse Studio; (Vancouver, British Columbia)
- Genre: Acoustic rock
- Length: 3:20
- Label: Geffen
- Songwriters: Tim McIlrath; Neil Hennessy
- Producer: Garth Richardson

Rise Against singles chronology
"Give It All" (2004)	"Swing Life Away" (2005)	"Life Less Frightening" (2005)

"Swing Life Away" is a song by American punk rock band Rise Against. It is an acoustic ballad, with a sharp guitar sound and optimistic lyrics about daily life and the working class. The song was first included in the 2003 compilation album Punk Goes Acoustic, and was later expanded upon in the band's 2004 album Siren Song of the Counter Culture.

The music and lyrics for "Swing Life Away" were written by Rise Against's lead vocalist Tim McIlrath and his roommate Neil Hennessy. The band decided to not include the song in their 2003 album Revolutions per Minute, as they felt that it would not fit in with the album's hardcore sound. At the insistence of a DreamWorks Records executive, the band revisited the song for Siren Song of the Counter Culture, and released it as the album's second single. The song reached number seventeen on the Bubbling Under Hot 100 chart and number twelve on the Alternative Songs chart, and was certified platinum by the Recording Industry Association of America.

Critics praised the song for its simple yet effective lyrics and sharp guitar sound. The accompanying music video follows the band members as they hang out with friends, and was intended to have an easygoing feel. "Swing Life Away" remains one of Rise Against's most popular songs, and McIlrath has noted how fans have used the song for various purposes, including school graduations, proms, weddings, and funerals. In 2011, Alternative Addiction wrote: "'Swing Life Away' catapulted Rise Against past Anti-Flag to the point where they've been with the past three albums as one of most established bands going in rock."

== Recording and composition ==
The music and lyrics for "Swing Life Away" were written by Rise Against's lead vocalist Tim McIlrath and his roommate Neil Hennessy. It was originally recorded in 2003, shortly after the recording sessions concluded for Rise Against's second album Revolutions per Minute. When producer Bill Stevenson heard the song, he asked McIlrath to put it on the album. Although the band members enjoyed the song, they questioned how an acoustic ballad could fit in an album characterized by its hardcore sound. Ultimately, the song was shelved. A year later, Fearless Records approached Rise Against about contributing to the Punk Goes Acoustic compilation album, and the band felt that "Swing Life Away" would be an appropriate song for the album.

The Punk Goes Acoustic version of "Swing Life Away" attracted little attention from fans, and McIlrath believed that the song had "died out". When Rise Against signed with DreamWorks Records in late 2003, (Note: Rise Against had originally signed with DreamWorks Records in 2003, but when DreamWorks Records folded into Geffen Records, the band was forced to switch labels.) a DreamWorks executive told the band that they should rerecord the song for their upcoming album, Siren Song of the Counter Culture, to which the band agreed to. When brought to producer Garth Richardson, he felt that the song was incomplete, commenting: "It's just too short. It's almost like a jingle and it needs another part." McIlrath decided to elaborate on the song, and used one of Sheryl Crow's guitars he found in the studio to add an instrumental bridge. This version of the song was included in Siren Song of the Counter Culture.

"Swing Life Away" is composed entirely of acoustic strumming, and its relatively positive sound plays in stark contrast to Rise Against's hardcore oeuvre. According to the song's sheet music, the composition is written in the time signature of 6/8 swing, with a moderate tempo of 52 beats per minute. It follows verse-chorus form, and is composed in the key G♭ major, with a melody that spans a tonal range of D♭_{4} to E♭_{5}. Ultimate Guitar Archive noted that the song uses a more "sharp guitar sound" as opposed to normal acoustics, which complements the band's punk roots. "Swing Life Away" contains simple lyrics that are about daily life and the working class.

== Release and reception ==
"Swing Life Away"
"Swing Life Away" uses a sharp acoustic sound and has simple lyrics.

"Swing Life Away" began playing on radio stations in late April 2005, as the second single from Siren Song of the Counter Culture. It is currently available in CD single and digital download formats. Commercially, the song reached three Billboard music charts, peaking at number seventeen on the Bubbling Under Hot 100 chart, number twelve on the Alternative Songs chart, and number ninety-five on the Pop 100 chart. It was certified platinum in May 2012 by the Recording Industry Association of America, denoting shipments of 1,000,000 copies.

In his review of Punk Goes Acoustic, Aubin Paul of Punknews.org wrote that "Swing Life Away" has a "simple but amazingly catchy guitar line", and called it his favorite track from the album. The Siren Song of the Counter Culture version received similarly positive reviews. Ultimate Guitar Archive praised nearly every aspect of the song, such as the "tear-inducing" lyrics, McIlrath's vocals, and its sharp guitar sound. The reviewer also called "Swing Life Away" the best song on the album. Sputnikmusic's Davey Boy characterized the lyrics as simple but effective, while Justin Donnelly of Blistering felt that "Swing Life Away" was one of three songs that ended the album in "huge style". By contrast, Marc Hogan of Pitchfork gave a much more unfavorable review, describing it as a "drearily unpoetic acoustic weeper".

== Music video ==
The accompanying music video was directed by Estevan Oriol and filmed in Chicago. The video begins with McIlrath exiting a subway car on the Chicago "L", a reference to the band's previous music video for "Give It All". He walks throughout Chicago meeting up with the other band members. They decide to go to a local bar and hang out with friends. While at the bar, McIlrath bumps into a man who angrily smashes the cassette tape of a song that McIlrath had been working on. The video ends with McIlrath writing the lyrics for the new song called "Swing Life Away".

McIlrath wrote the video treatment, and remarked how the band at first had no idea what they wanted to do for the video due to the song's unique sound. McIlrath did know that since "Swing Life Away" has simple lyrics, he wanted the video to replicate the song's easygoing feel. The video was shot over a year after the release of Siren Song Of The Counter Culture, a rarity in the music industry, as most videos are shot only a few months after the song's parent album is released. Parts of the video were filmed at The Fireside Bowl, where Rise Against played some of their first concerts. Looking back on the video, McIlrath said: "Parts of it are kind of cheesy...but it captured where I was at when that song was written - it was written when I was living in a house with four roommates in a bedroom and we were all just trying to figure out what to do with our lives."

== Impact ==
Dave Kim of WGRD-FM listed "Swing Life Away" as the sixth best Rise Against song, saying that although it is a significant departure from their normal sound, "we'll always welcome the softer side of Rise Against". The song has also been credited with helping Rise Against achieve mainstream appeal. In 2011, Alternative Addiction wrote "'Swing Life Away' catapulted Rise Against past Anti-Flag to the point where they've been with the past three albums as one of most established bands going in rock."

McIlrath commented on the song's popularity in a 2006 interview, saying that several fans had been using it for school graduations, proms, weddings, and funerals. In particular, he remarked how one fan sent him a wedding invitation, and the front of the invitation simply had the lyrics for "Swing Life Away". Although McIlrath was happy with the song's reception, he explicitly mentioned that no acoustic songs would appear on the band's fourth album The Sufferer & the Witness, as he did not want it to become a permanent aspect for Rise Against albums.

In 2013, American rapper Machine Gun Kelly released the mixtape Black Flag, which included a cover of "Swing Life Away". The cover has new verses written by Kelly, and features guest vocals by Kellin Quinn of Sleeping with Sirens. Rise Against approved of the cover, after Kelly wrote a letter to the band explaining that he "wouldn’t do anything to make them or their song look corny". Originally, Quinn had recorded vocals for an acoustic rendition, but Kelly decided against this, insisting that the cover be more melodic rock.

== Credits and personnel ==
Credits adapted from the liner notes of the "Swing Life Away" CD single.

Rise Against

- Tim McIlrath – lead vocals, acoustic guitar
- Neil Hennessy – backing vocals

Production

- Garth Richardson – producer
- Dean Maher – audio engineering
- Andy Wallace – mixing

== Charts ==
=== Weekly charts ===
Weekly chart performance for "Swing Life Away"
Chart (2005)	Peak position
US Bubbling Under Hot 100 (Billboard)	17
US Alternative Airplay (Billboard)	12
US Pop 100 (Billboard)	95

=== Year-end charts ===
Year-end chart performance for "Swing Life Away"
Chart (2005)	Position
US Modern Rock Tracks (Billboard)	34

== Certifications ==
Certifications for "Swing Life Away"
Region	Certification	Certified units/sales
United States (RIAA)	Platinum	1,000,000^{^}
^{^} Shipments figures based on certification alone.
