= Ruiner =

Ruiner may refer to:

== Video games ==
- Ruiner (video game), a 2017 shooter video game
- Ruiner Pinball, a 1995 pinball video game

== Music ==
- Ruiner (band), an American hardcore punk band
- Ruiner (A Wilhelm Scream album), 2005
- Ruiner (Nothing,Nowhere album), 2018
- "Ruiner", a song by Nine Inch Nails from The Downward Spiral
