= Trauma Factory =

Studio album by Nothing,Nowhere
- Released: February 19, 2021
- Length: 41:47
- Label: Fueled by Ramen
- Producers: Jay Vee; Joe Mulherin; Judge; Misogi; Sam Klempner; Y2K; Zakk Cervini

Nothing,Nowhere chronology
Ruiner (2018)	Trauma Factory (2021)	Void Eternal (2023)

Professional ratings
Aggregate scores
Source	Rating
AnyDecentMusic?	6.6/10
Metacritic	69/100
Review scores
Source	Rating
AllMusic	3.5/5 stars
Clash	8/10
DIY	3.5/5 stars
Kerrang!	3/5 stars
Pitchfork	6.6/10

Trauma Factory is the fourth studio album by American rapper nothing,nowhere. It was released on February 19, 2021, by Fueled by Ramen.

== Release ==
Nothing,Nowhere announced the release of the new album on December 7, 2020.

=== Singles ===
The first single from the album, "Blood" was released on October 27, 2020, and features KennyHoopla and producer Judge.

=== Music videos ===
The official music video of "Blood" was released on YouTube on the same day as the single, and was directed by Mason Mercer and produced by Evan McGillivray.

On January 20, 2021, Nothing,Nowhere released "Fake Friend" on YouTube.

The third video "Upside Down" was released on February 19, 2021, the same day as the album release.

== Critical reception ==
Trauma Factory was met with "generally favorable" reviews from critics. At Metacritic, which assigns a weighted average rating out of 100 to reviews from mainstream publications, this release received an average score of 69 based on 6 reviews. At AnyDecentMusic?, the release was given a 6.6 out of 10 based on 6 reviews.

Writing for AllMusic, Fred Thomas said: "Trauma Factory, the fourth proper studio album from nothing,nowhere, was the result of two years of experimentation with songwriting and genre, whittled down to its still hefty 15-song track listing from dozens of songs Mulherin wrote while playing with the stylistic boundaries of the project. Trauma Factory rarely stays in the same mode from one song to the next, but its grab-bag approach never comes off as disjointed. Even with the quick-shifting styles, the emotional charge of the songs and Mulherin's distinctive songwriting sensibilities expand nothing,nowhere's range and keep the album from devolving into a scattered mess." Susan Hansen of Clash wrote: "nothing,nowhere.'s intention to create an album unrestricted by genre shines through this project, as he incorporates elements of post-punk, new wave, hard rock, electro-pop, folk and more. While fifteen tracks could seem rich, each song averages no more than two to three minutes." Jake Richardson of Kerrang! said: "Trauma Factory's straight-up rap moments are more hit-and-miss, with the likes of exile and upside down feeling coherent enough but lacking in bite, demonstrating how nothing,nowhere. sounds best when the musical backdrop is thicker and leans more into the heavier side of Joe’s sound."

== Track listing ==
Trauma Factory track listing
No.	Title	Writer(s)	Producer(s)	Length
1.	"Trauma Factory"	Joe Mulherin	Mulherin	1:34
2.	"Lights (4444)"	Mulherin; Joseph Valla II; Zakk Cervini	Mulherin; Jay Vee; Cervini	2:40
3.	"Buck"	Mulherin; Valla; Cervini	Mulherin; Jay Vee; Cervini	2:35
4.	"Love or Chemistry"	Mulherin; Valla; Cervini	Mulherin; Jay Vee; Cervini	2:19
5.	"Exile"	Mulherin; Valla	Mulherin; Jay Vee	2:59
6.	"Upside Down"	Mulherin; Valla; Ari Starace	Jay Vee; Y2K	3:07
7.	"Pain Place" (featuring Misogi)	Mulherin; Zain Siddiqui	Mulherin; Misogi	3:03
8.	"Fake Friend"	Mulherin; Valla; Sam Klempner; Michael Matosic; Jake Torrey	Sam Klempner; Cervini; Jay Vee^{[a]}	2:49
9.	"Death"	Mulherin; Cervini	Mulherin; Cervini	2:07
10.	"Pretend"	Mulherin; Cervini	Mulherin; Cervini	2:59
11.	"Blood" (featuring KennyHoopla and Judge)	Mulherin; Kenneth La'Ron; Paul Schuele Judge	Judge	2:38
12.	"Nightmare"	Mulherin; Valla; Cervini	Mulherin; Jay Vee; Cervini	2:54
13.	"Crave"	Mulherin; Valla; Cervini	Mulherin; Jay Vee; Cervini	2:24
14.	"Real"	Mulherin; Valla; Cervini	Mulherin; Jay Vee; Cervini	3:36
15.	"Barely Bleeding"	Mulherin; Valla; Cervini	Mulherin; Jay Vee; Cervini	4:03
Total length:				41:51

Note

- ^{^[a]} indicates an additional producer

== Personnel ==
Credits for Trauma Factory adapted from liner notes.

=== Musicians ===
- Joe Mulherin – vocals, guitars, bass, drums writing (all)
- MISOGI – additional vocals (7)
- KennyHoopla – additional vocals (10)

=== Additional ===
- JUDGE – guest producer (10)
- Joe Mulherin – art direction, design
- Chris Athens – mastering
- Zakk Cervini – mixing
- Robert Gotham – art direction, design
- Fox Beach – photography
