= Black Cards =

American electronic band (2010–2012)

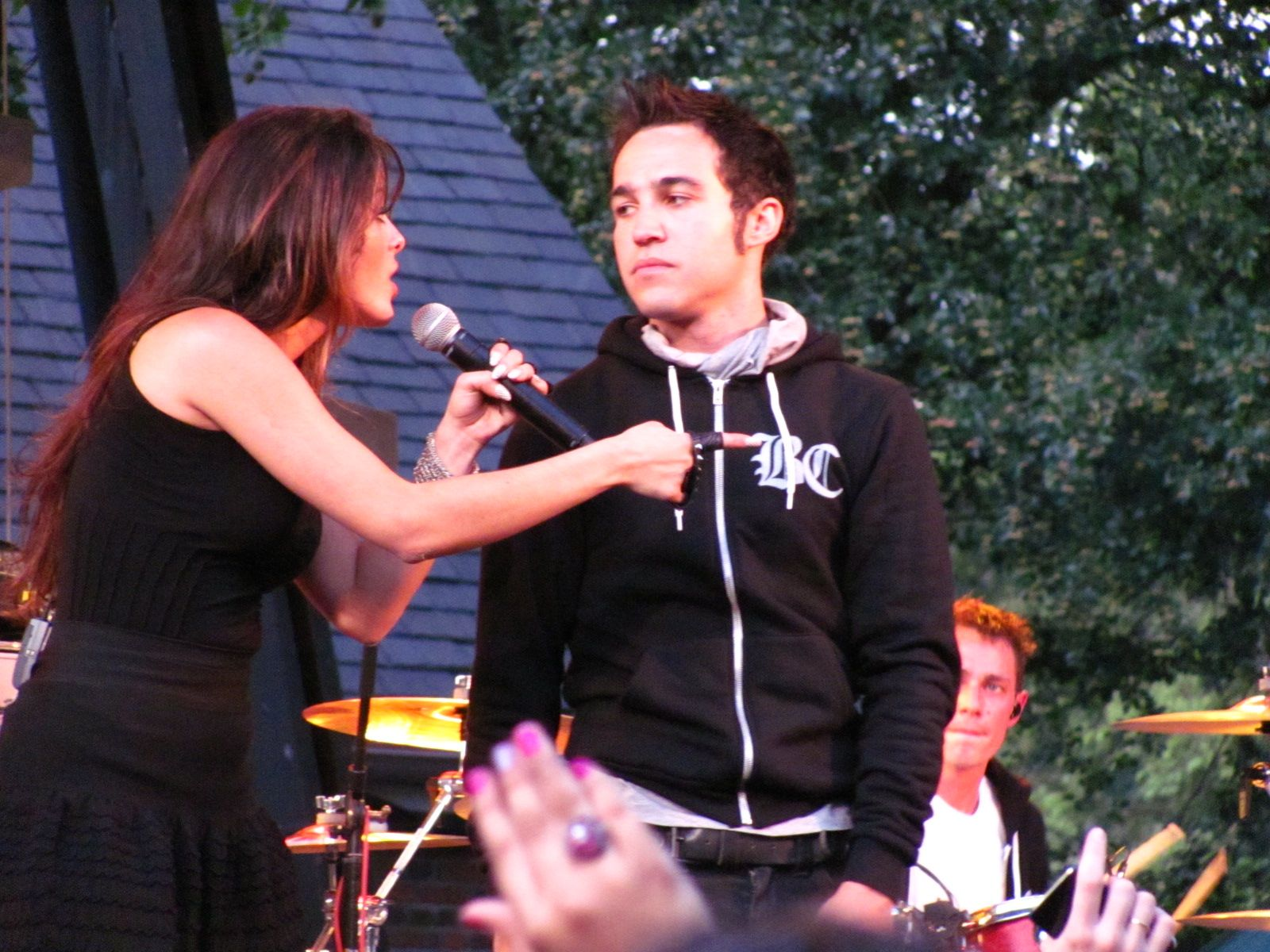
- Pete Wentz with Bebe Rexha in 2011 (final lineup).

Background information
- Genres: Electropop; ska; rock; pop; dance; dubstep
- Years active: 2010–2012
- Labels: Decaydance; Island Def Jam
- Past members: Bebe Rexha; Nate Patterson; Spencer Peterson; Pete Wentz
- Website: blackcardsmusic.com

Black Cards was an American electronic music band that formed in July 2010 as Fall Out Boy bassist Pete Wentz's new main project following the band's hiatus. Originally conceived as a four-piece electropop band, Wentz played bass guitar and wrote the band's lyrics, while singer Bebe Rexha filled in on vocals. The pair met when Wentz and producer Sam Hollander overheard Rexha recording demos at their studio. Nate Patterson and Spencer Peterson completed the lineup with guitar and drums respectively.

Shortly after forming, the group released songs to YouTube, and one to iTunes. Initially the band had planned to write and record a full-length LP to be released in Summer 2011. However, in January 2012, after multiple delays and uncertainty about the band's future, the project came to a halt. Rexha left the band to pursue a solo career and Wentz reevaluated the band's future. Shortly after, the group released a statement saying that they were starting over and on January 26, they released a remix mixtape entitled Up the Anti – Volume 1.

After releasing the mixtape, the band went on to say they would continue remixing tracks by other artists and would be releasing both unreleased tracks from the scrapped album as well as new, original material. Wentz also hinted at the possibility of an upcoming tour. Since that time, the duo has played at various shows and festivals across the U.S. and released a remix mixtape. In July 2012, Use Your Disillusion EP was released which they worked on with Twice as Nice. Black Cards became inactive as Fall Out Boy secretly recorded an album towards the end of 2012 and announced the end of their hiatus on February 4, 2013. In June 2019, over seven years after splitting from Black Cards, Rexha teased a solo track featuring Wentz, titled "Heaven Sent".

== History ==
=== Formation (2010) ===
Black Cards was formed in July 2010 by Pete Wentz. Fall Out Boy went on hiatus in late 2009, with Wentz announcing his desire to take a break from music and concentrate more on being with his wife and child. However, Wentz eventually ventured into another musical project, this time experimenting a lot more going to a more electronic dance-ska direction with the music. Wentz had said he was taking time off with his family, when he started being inspired again by such Jamaican reggae songs as Culture's "Two Sevens Clash" and The Gladiators' "Warriors". Wentz then contacted producer Sam Hollander (Gym Class Heroes, Cobra Starship, Hey Monday) and discussed the idea with him to mash up ska, dance and reggae with '80s British rock and pop to create a new experimental sound. Wentz did not want to attempt to replace Patrick Stump (his bandmate in Fall Out Boy), and decided to go in a new direction taking a female vocalist instead – amateur singer Bebe Rexha.

Pete Wentz originally maintained a level of secrecy around the identity of other members. In an interview with MTV.com on July 20, 2010, Wentz had denied the rumors that either former Chiodos member Craig Owens or Panic! at the Disco's Brendon Urie were part of the new project. Wentz later revealed the identity of the band's drummer as Spencer Peterson (formerly of Saves the Day, VersaEmerge and Hidden in Plain View) and the band's guitarist as Nate Patterson (of The Receiving End of Sirens) through his blog.

The band has put up two snippets from songs the band has been working on, on their official website. The songs' working titles are "Beating in My Chest" and "Club Called Heaven". The title of "Beating in My Chest" has since then been changed to "Dirty Little Fingerprints". The band's first European tour took place between October 25–31, 2010. They played at 5 venues in Glasgow, Manchester, London, Berlin and Paris. This short European tour was preceded by three special North American dates on October 14, 15 and 16, 2010, which took place in Hartford, Connecticut, Providence, Rhode Island and Poughkeepsie, New York. Black Cards released "Club Called Heaven" as their first single through MySpace, YouTube and their official website. The song features rapper Chiddy of the group Chiddy Bang. Since early October 2010, the band has announced and released multiple songs on various social network sites, such as Facebook and Vevo. Black Cards contributed their song "Dr. Jekyll & Mr. Fame" to the compilation album Download to Donate: Japan Tsunami Relief to provide relief for Japan after the earthquake and tsunami on March 11, 2011.

=== Proposed debut album and line up change (2011–2012) ===
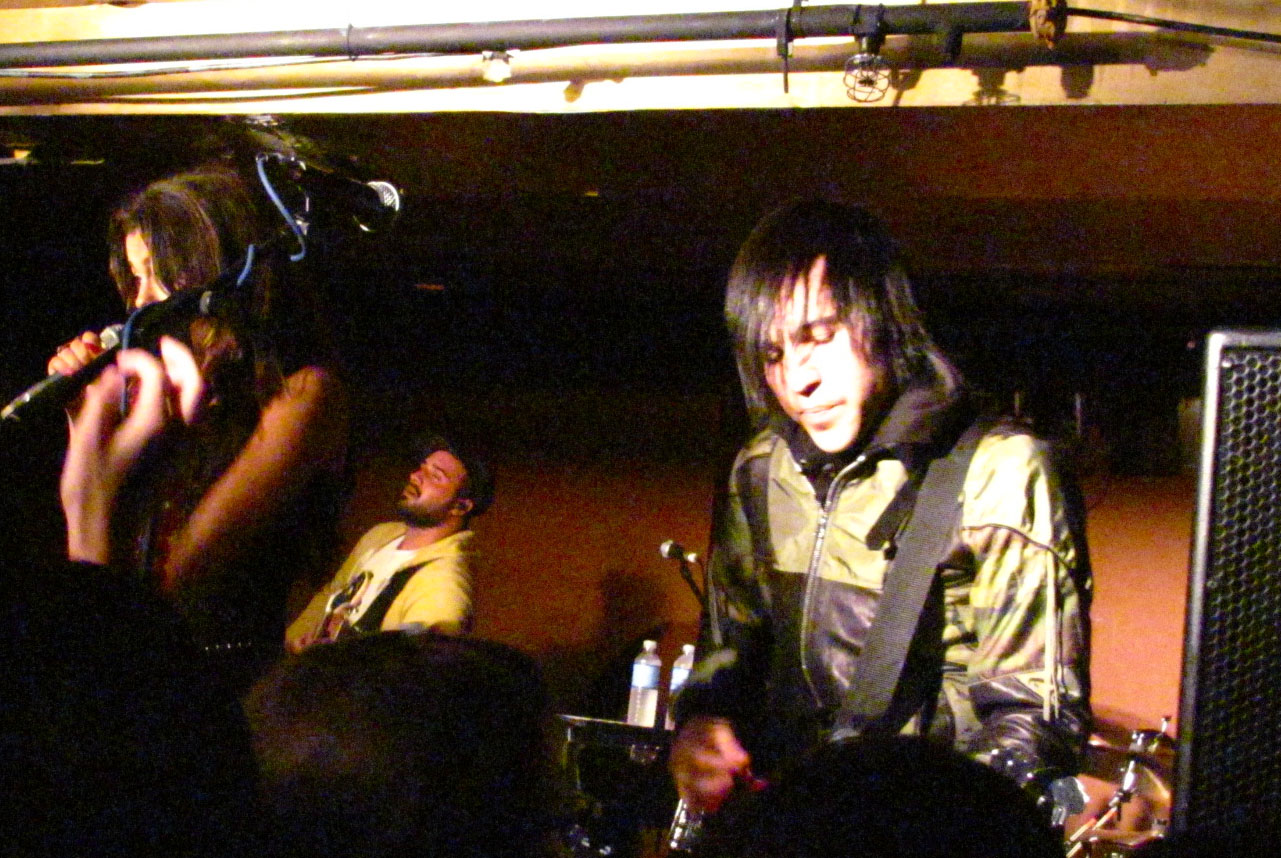
Black Cards performing in Poughkeepsie, New York on October 16, 2010 at The Loft (former lineup).

Pete Wentz told MTV that the untitled album was initially set for release in the summer of 2011. "It's done and I'm just going to keep putting songs out, so we have to keep putting more songs on the album." He also hinted there would be guest spots from Travie McCoy, Neon Trees frontman Tyler Glenn and possibly Shaggy. Wentz noted that he was aware that fans had been waiting for a while now to hear the disc, but the delay was necessary to line up support for the band at their label, Island/Def Jam.

"I don't feel like there is a holdup. I feel like people know that it's a new project at the label and really want to roll it out in the right way, and the building has really gotten behind it. But it's different than Fall Out Boy, and it's different than stuff we've done before, so ... with Fall Out Boy, it'd be like, 'OK, this is rollout, we've got it, we'll go around the world.' And with this, it's new and it's new territory, so we're working with new people and it'll be exciting."

In May 2011, in an interview with Spin, Pete Wentz spoke about the record's completion, saying: "We have a whole Black Cards album done, and now we're just writing more songs that might beat out some of the existing songs." Not long after commenting on its completion Nate Patterson was kicked out of Black Cards on August 21, 2011. He posted the information on microblogging site Twitter, stating that it was the record label's decision to remove him from the band. In October 2011 Pete Wentz announced that the album was being planned for release in early 2012, describing the elements of the album as "weird pop" and saying its progress has been hindered based upon figuring out its sound.

On January 12, 2012, the band announced via Facebook that vocalist Bebe Rexha was no longer a member of the group. They also debuted the album artwork for an upcoming mixtape entitled Up the Anti – Volume 1. A day after, January 13, 2012, Bebe Rexha released a statement explaining that she left the band to explore opportunities as a solo artist. Both parties described the split as being amicable.

=== New beginnings (2012) ===
Following the departure of Rexha, Wentz posted a formal statement on the band's website explaining the details of the split and how they planned to move forward, specifying that both he and Peterson would continue to remix other artists as well as hinting at the release of recorded material from their unreleased album. On January 14, Wentz tweeted that the band were also working on original material, and that the lyrics would be the first he's written from his perspective since working on Fall Out Boy's third studio album Infinity on High. When asked who would be singing on the upcoming material, Wentz responded that he would sing on some of the tracks and that the other songs would feature vocals from musicians he's become friends with over the years, including Gabe Saporta of Cobra Starship and Pat Monahan of Train.

On January 26, Up the Anti – Volume 1 was released on electronic music news website Gotta Dance Dirty. The mixtape featured remixes of several established acts, including Rihanna, Jay-Z, Skrillex, M83, Major Lazer, Waka Flocka Flame, and others. The DJ duo has played some US shows.

Black Cards released the EP Use Your Disillusion on July 24, 2012.

== Members ==
=== Former members ===
- Pete Wentz – bass guitar, production (2010–2012)
- Spencer Peterson – drums, production (2010–2012)
- Nate Patterson – lead guitar (2010–2011)
- Bebe Rexha – lead vocals (2010–2012)

== Discography ==
=== Extended plays ===
- Use Your Disillusion (2012)
  - "Wolf Slayer"
  - "End of Pretend" (featuring Matthew Koma)
  - "F.T.W."
  - "Talk Dirty" (featuring Amba Shepherd)

=== Mixtapes ===
- Up the Anti – Volume 1 (2012)
- Moodswing x Karmaloop SXSW Mixtape (with DJ Benzi) (2012)

=== Singles ===
- "Dr. Jekyll and Mr. Fame" (2011)
