= Pete Wentz =

American musician and songwriter (born 1979)

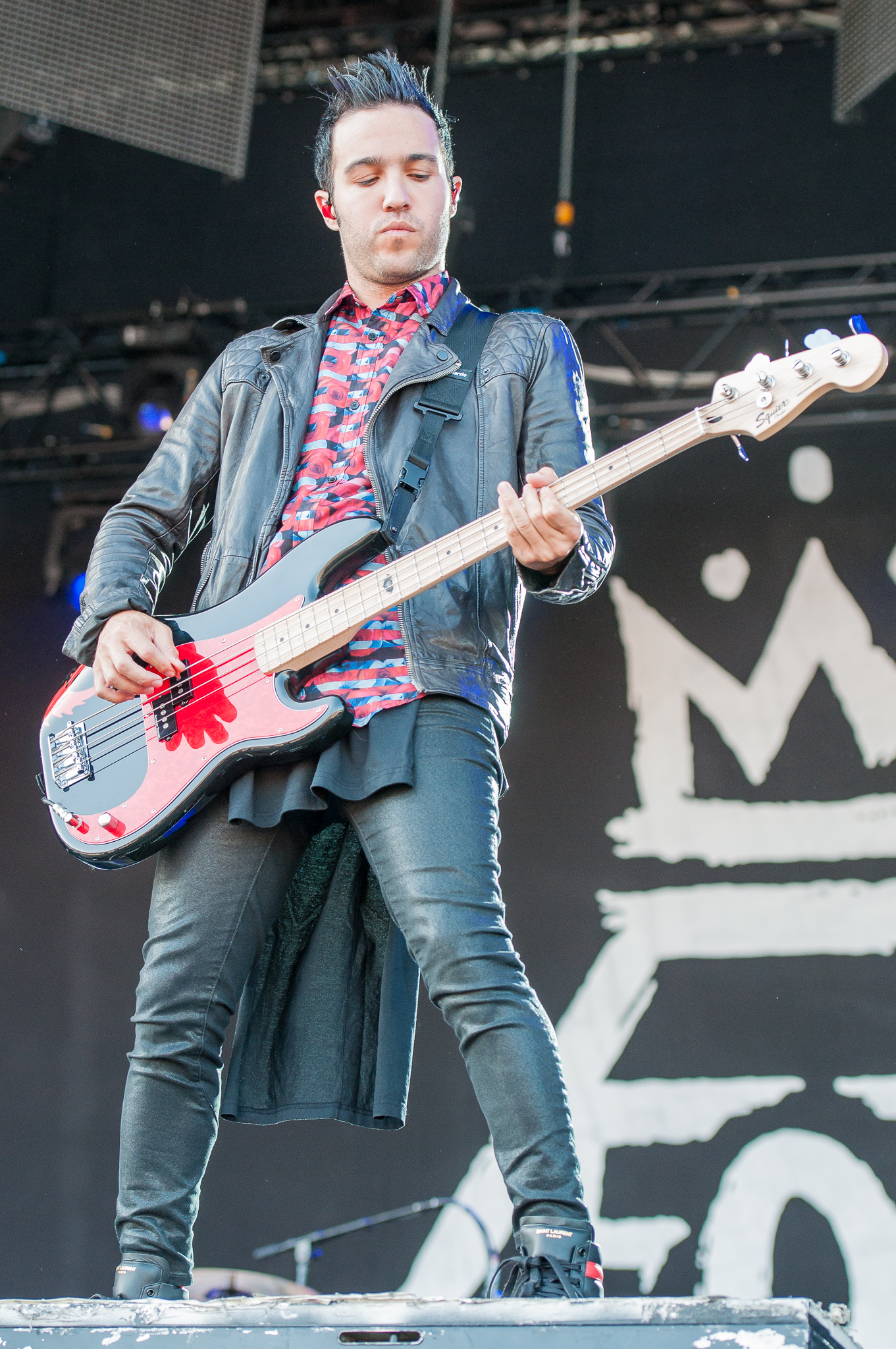
- Wentz performing with Fall Out Boy in 2014
- Born: Peter Lewis Kingston Wentz III; June 5, 1979 (age 47); Wilmette, Illinois, U.S.
- Occupations: Musician; singer; songwriter; record executive
- Years active: 1993–present
- Spouse: Ashlee Simpson (m. 2008; div. 2011)
- Partner: Meagan Camper (2011–present)
- Children: 3
- Musical career
- Genres: Pop-punk; pop rock; emo; alternative rock; metalcore; hardcore punk; electropop
- Instruments: Bass; vocals
- Labels: DCD2; Fueled by Ramen; Island
- Member of: Fall Out Boy
- Formerly of: Black Cards; Arma Angelus; Racetraitor
- Website: petewentz.com

Signature
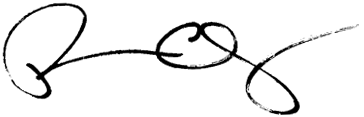

Peter Lewis Kingston Wentz III (born June 5, 1979) is an American musician, songwriter and record executive. He is the co-founder, bassist and lyricist for the rock band Fall Out Boy. Before the band's formation in 2001, Wentz was a fixture of the Chicago hardcore scene and was the lead singer and songwriter for Arma Angelus, a metalcore band. During Fall Out Boy's hiatus from 2009 to 2012, Wentz formed the experimental, electropop and dubstep group Black Cards. He owns a record label, DCD2 Records, which has signed bands including Panic! at the Disco and Gym Class Heroes.

Fall Out Boy returned from hiatus in February 2013, and have since released four albums: Save Rock and Roll, American Beauty/American Psycho, Mania, and So Much (for) Stardust.

Wentz has also ventured into other non-musical projects, including writing, acting, and fashion; in 2005 he founded a clothing company called Clandestine Industries. He hosted seasons 1 and 2 of the television show Best Ink and, runs the film production company called Bartskull Films, and owned a bar called Angels & Kings, which had locations in New York and Chicago. His philanthropic activities include collaborations with Invisible Children, Inc. and UNICEF's Tap Project, a fundraising project that helps bring clean drinking water to people worldwide, People magazine states that "no bassist has upstaged a frontman as well as Pete Wentz of Fall Out Boy." He is also a minority owner of the Phoenix Rising FC, a USL Championship team.

== Early life ==
Peter Lewis Kingston Wentz III was born in Wilmette, Illinois, an affluent suburb of Chicago. His parents are Dale Wentz (née Lewis), a high school admissions counselor, and Pete Wentz II, an attorney. Wentz is of English and German descent on his father's side and Afro-Jamaican descent on his mother's side. He has a younger sister, Hillary, and a younger brother, Andrew. His maternal grandfather, Arthur Winston Lewis, served as the U.S. Ambassador to Sierra Leone; Arthur Winston Lewis' cousin was General Colin Powell.

Wentz' parents met in the 1970s while campaigning for Joe Biden's senatorial run. Wentz recalled in a Rolling Stone interview that his earliest musical memory was listening to The Foundations' song "Build Me Up Buttercup" in the back of his father's car. Wentz attended North Shore Country Day School, where he was an all-state soccer player. He considered pursuing a professional career in the sport, but decided that music was a more fulfilling choice; he says that he "always had a magical connection to the ball. But it didn't feel like an adventure. Music was more of a challenge and, in the end, felt more interesting."

During his first year of high school, he began skipping school regularly and smoking marijuana with friends, but later quit as it was affecting his grades at school. After graduating from high school in 1997, he attended DePaul University, where he studied political science, dropping out one quarter shy of graduation to focus on Fall Out Boy.

== Music career ==
=== Arma Angelus and other early projects (1993–2002) ===
Wentz was primarily involved in the Chicago hardcore punk scene and was in several bands in the late 1990s. He formed his first band, First Born, in 1993. By the mid-1990s, he became an infrequent bass player for Racetraitor.

Wentz formed the metalcore band Novena (later renamed to Arma Angelus) soon after, along with Adam Bishop of XshroudX and Extinction; Daniel Binaei of Racetraitor; and Timothy Miller. The band cycled through six bassists before recruiting Tim McIlrath, who had recently departed from Baxter. They released their debut EP the Grave End of the Shovel in 2000. Around this time, Binaei's partial relocation to California led to the hiring of Jay Jancetic of Extinction. McIlrath then departed from the band in 2000, in order to focus on Transistor Revolt and the Killing Tree, leading to the band's recruitment of, XshroudX and Restraint member, Christopher Gutierrez. In 2001, the released their debut album Where Sleeplessness Is Rest From Nightmares. In support of the album they toured with Throwdown and Hatebreed, and performed at Hellfest. These tours also saw the recruitment of bassist Joe Trohman after Gutierrez's departure; however, Trohman's severe stage fright led to the band bringing him back mid-tour and relegating Trohman to selling merchandise.

Around this time, Wentz also played in Birthright, Extinction and Yellow Road Priest. He and Arma Angelus' bassist Joe Trohman founded the pop-punk band Fall Out Boy after Trohman introduced Wentz to a musical acquaintance, Patrick Stump. Andy Hurley agreed to drum part-time, but only joined the band full-time later. In 2002, Arma Angelus played its last show.

=== Fall Out Boy (2001–2009, 2013–present) ===
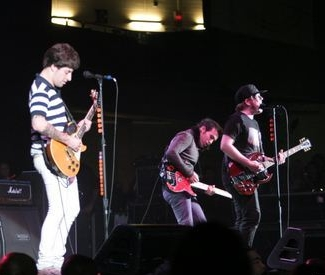
Fall Out Boy in concert in 2006. From left to right: Joe Trohman, Pete Wentz, Patrick Stump.

In 2002, Fall Out Boy released an EP called Fall Out Boy/Project Rocket Split EP. Soon after, in 2003, the band released their mini-LP Fall Out Boy's Evening Out with Your Girlfriend on Uprising Records. This album would later be digitally remastered and reissued after the band's rise of popularity on the major label Island Records. In 2003, the band released their first full-length album, Take This to Your Grave through Fueled by Ramen. Fall Out Boy signed with major label Island Records in 2003 and in 2004 released an acoustic EP and DVD entitled My Heart Will Always Be the B-Side to My Tongue.

Their second album, From Under the Cork Tree, was released in 2005. Wentz wrote the lyrics to the lead single, "Sugar, We're Goin Down" with his dad in Chicago; the song peaked at No. 8 on the Billboard Hot 100 and spent months in the top 50 of the Hot 100, marking five weeks in the top 10 and fourteen weeks in the top 20. The band's major label debut album has since been certified double platinum by the RIAA as well as "Sugar, We're Goin Down".

In 2007, Fall Out Boy's third album, Infinity on High was released to major success, debuting at No. 1 on the Billboard 200 with 260,000 sales, spurred by the lead single, "This Ain't a Scene, It's an Arms Race", which reached the top ten in the US & UK and topped the charts in New Zealand. The second single, "Thnks fr th Mmrs" sold more than 2 million units in the US. The band's fourth studio album, Folie à Deux was released on December 13, 2008, and debuted at No. 8 on the Billboard 200. The band toured extensively in support of their albums.

In November 2009, the four band members announced that they would take an indefinite hiatus, saying they were unsure of the future of the band. Wentz has said that his personal reason for taking a break was that he believed that his name and marriage to pop singer Ashlee Simpson had become a hindrance for the band. He added: "I think the world needs a little less Pete Wentz".

On February 4, 2013, Fall Out Boy unexpectedly announced their return, along with an album and single to which all four members contributed. Once again, Wentz had main control of songwriting duties. On April 12, 2013, the band released a new album entitled, Save Rock and Roll, featuring the lead single My Songs Know What You Did in the Dark (Light Em Up), and dates for a new tour. The band played their first show in over three years on the night of February 4 in Chicago. Save Rock and Roll peaked at No. 1 on the Billboard 200, selling 154,000 copies in its first week, becoming the band's fourth consecutive top 10 album. With Fall Out Boy, Wentz toured heavily throughout 2013 and 2014 on the album, selling out arenas worldwide, with bands such as Paramore on the Monumentour. In October 2013, they released a new EP, PAX AM Days which they recorded in a two-day session with producer Ryan Adams.

The band's sixth studio album, American Beauty/American Psycho, became the band's third Billboard 200 No. 1 album, debuting with 192,000 first week sales and 218,000 equivalent album units. The album was preceded by the triple Platinum top 10 single Centuries. Uma Thurman was released to mainstream radio on April 14, 2014; it peaked at 22 on the 'Billboard' Top 100 and was certified platinum in August 2015.

In April 2017, Fall Out Boy released Young and Menace, the lead single for the band's seventh studio album. The band's seventh album Mania was officially released January 19, 2018, and debuted at number one on the Billboard 200, making it the band's third consecutive and fourth chart-topping debut overall.

In 2018, Fall Out Boy headlined Wrigley Field in the band's hometown of Chicago, marking a milestone in their career as their first headlining show at a stadium.

=== Black Cards (2010–2012) ===
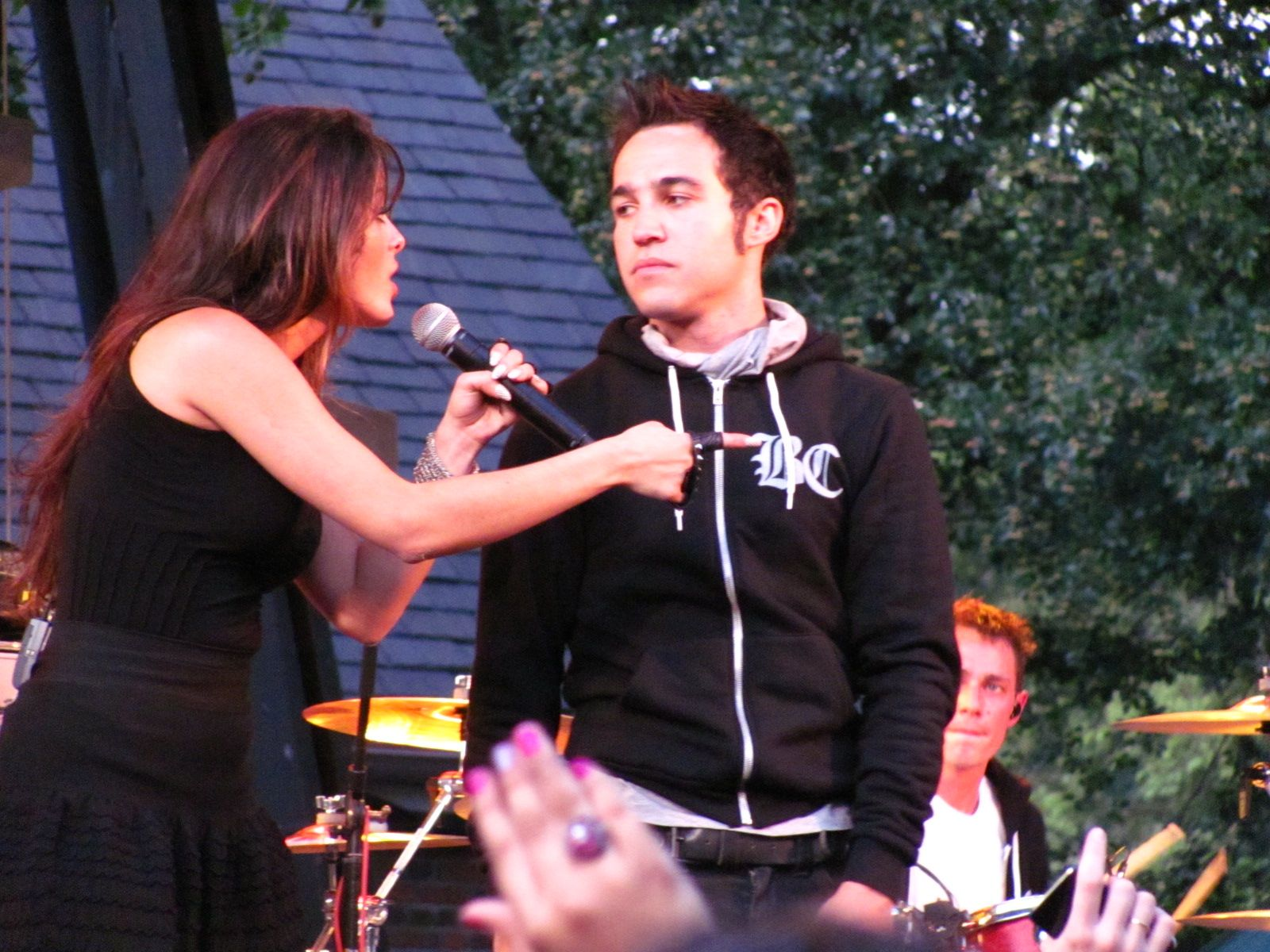
Wentz with Bebe Rexha in 2011

In July 2010, Wentz, with singer Bebe Rexha, guitarist Nate Patterson, and drummer Spencer Peterson, formed the ska/electropop band Black Cards. Originally, the band had planned to release a full-length LP in the summer of 2011. However, after several delays, the departures of both Patterson and Rexha, and general uncertainty about the band's future, the group reshuffled, scrapping the original album and announcing plans to release a mixtape, write new material, and continue to remix tracks by other artists.

With regards to the band's sound, Wentz has said that during the time he took off to spend with his family, he began to be inspired by Jamaican reggae songs such as Culture's "Two Sevens Clash" and The Gladiators' "Warriors". Wentz then contacted producer Sam Hollander (Gym Class Heroes, Cobra Starship, Hey Monday) and discussed the idea with him to mash up ska, dance and reggae with 80s British rock and pop to create a new experimental sound.

On January 12, 2012, the band announced via Facebook that vocalist Bebe Rexha was no longer a member of the group.

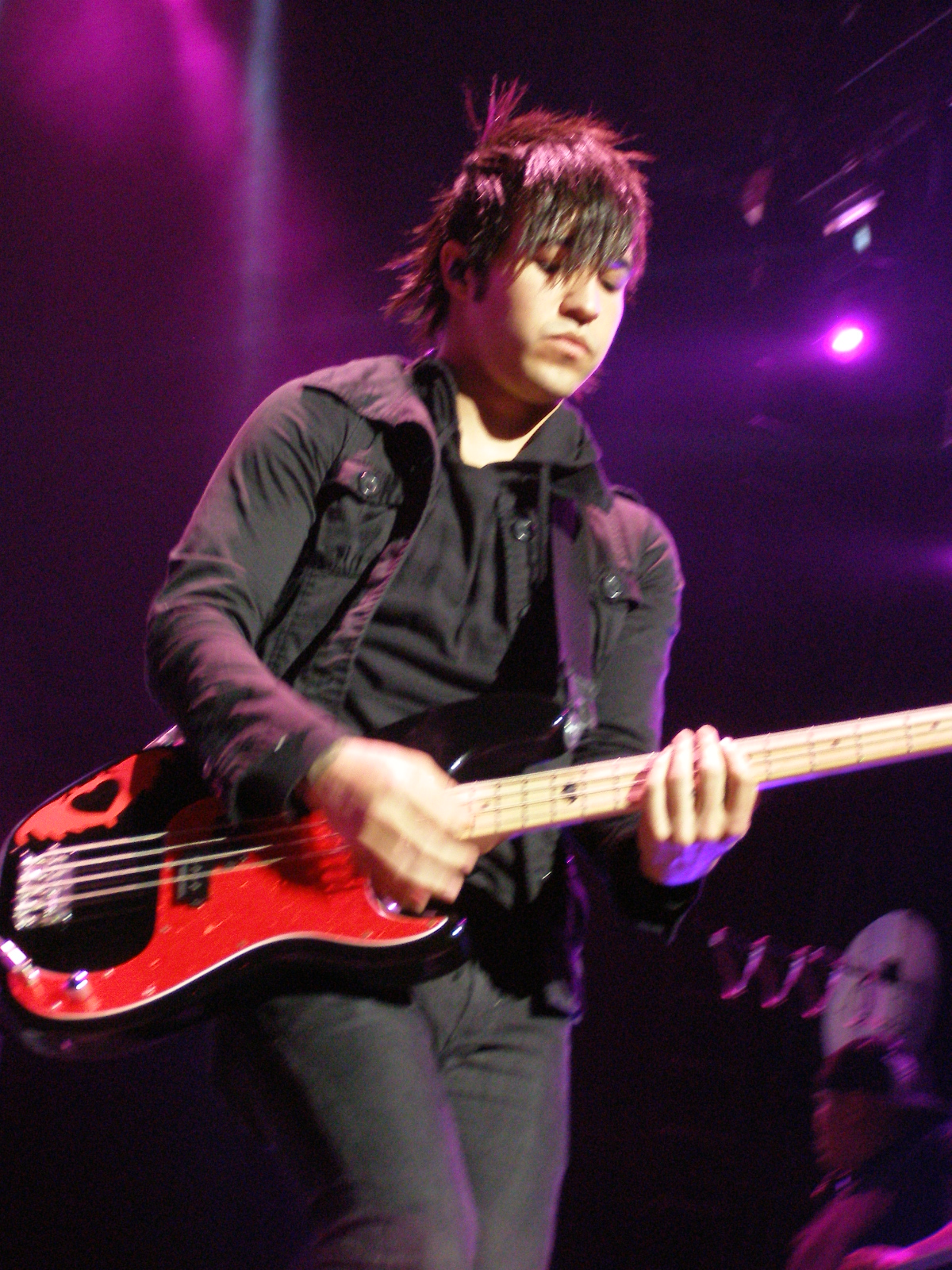
Wentz with his Signature Precision Bass

=== Musical equipment ===
Wentz was a long-term user of the Fender Precision Bass, stating his first "real" bass was a Sunburst 1957 Fender Precision Bass, which he used extensively earlier on in his career. In 2007, Wentz partnered with Fender to release his own signature Precision Bass through their budget Squier brand. In 2023, Wentz Partnered with Sterling by Music Man to release his own signature StingRay Bass. Early on in Fall Out Boy's career, Wentz used a rack-mounted Tech 21 SansAmp RBI Preamp, In recent years, Wentz has used a Line6 HX Stomp for effects and amp modeling.

== Non-performance projects ==
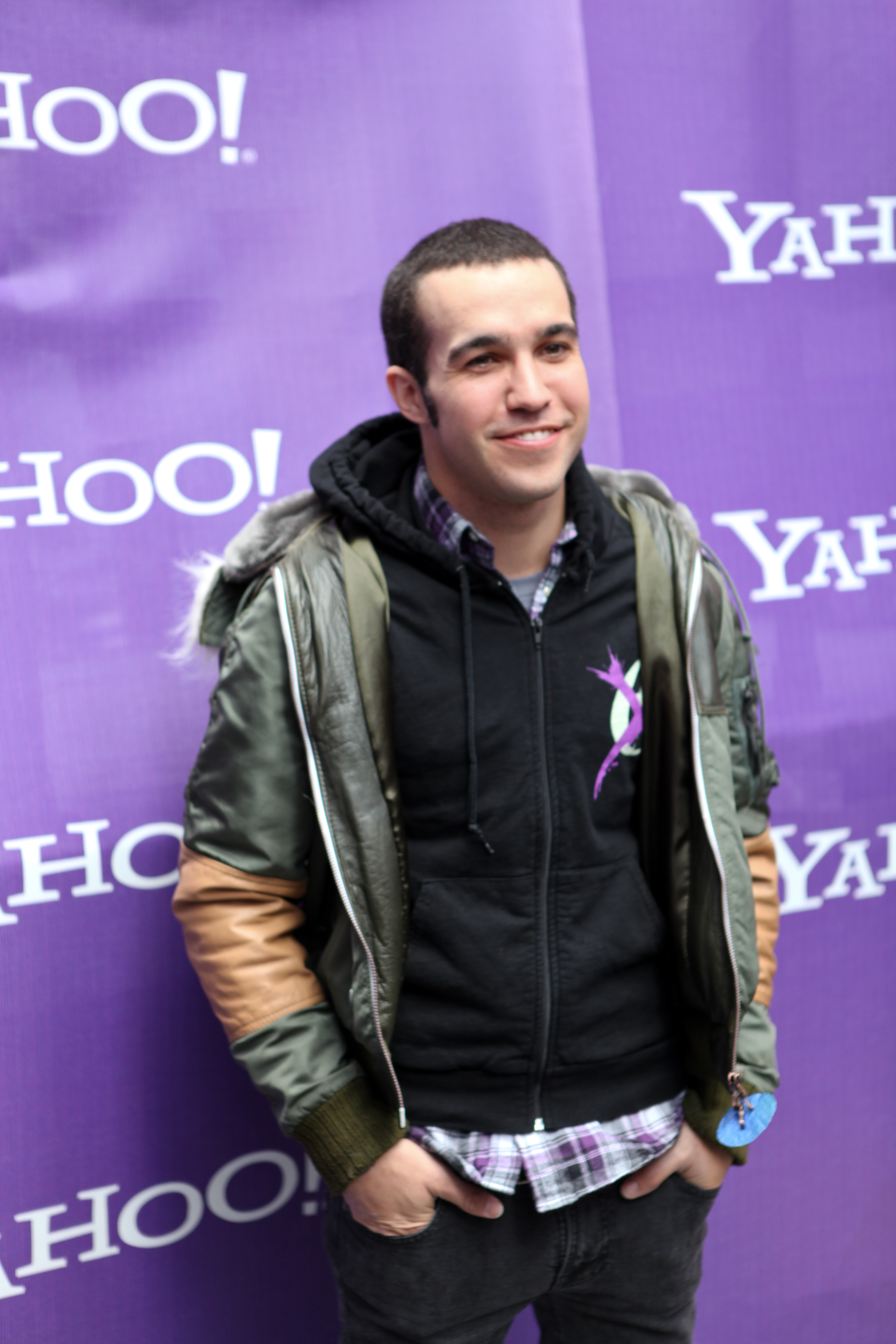
Wentz at the Yahoo! Yodel Studio in October 2009

Apart from his musical career, Wentz has been involved in various entrepreneurial ventures. Fall Out Boy bandmate Patrick Stump says of Wentz's endeavors: "It scares me sometimes, watching him. The two seconds you're not with that dude he's made 30 decisions that are going to affect our band for the rest of the year." Wentz's company, Clandestine Industries, distributed books, clothing, and other merchandise. On August 2, 2007, fashion company DKNY joined a partnership with Clandestine Industries. Wentz himself has served as a model on the DKNY/Clandestine promo website.

In April 2007, Wentz came out with his own signature Squier Precision Bass. It has a black body with a red shell pickguard and special graphics that include Wentz's own red bat/heart design on the body, plus a black bat/diamond fingerboard inlay at the 12th fret. It also features Wentz's signature on the back of the headstock. Wentz owns a very similar custom Fender bass with a purple pickguard and bat/heart. In 2008, Wentz gave his son, Bronx Wentz, a three-quarter-sized modified version of his guitar.

Wentz opened a nightclub in New York with his bandmates as well as members of Gym Class Heroes, The Academy Is..., and Cobra Starship; the bands' managers are also involved in the enterprise. Called Angels & Kings, the club occupies the former space on 11th Street near Avenue A that housed the Orchid Lounge. Notable guests, including Tommy Hilfiger, arrived for the grand opening on April 20, 2007. In June 2007, Wentz celebrated the opening of Angels & Kings' second location in Chicago.

On December 13, 2008, Wentz, along with Travis McCoy of Gym Class Heroes, created several pieces for an art exhibit at Gallery 1988 in Los Angeles called "Without You, I'm Just Me". The exhibit closed on December 24, 2008. Wentz appeared in the season 5 episode of CSI: NY, "Point of No Return", along with then-wife Ashlee Simpson. Wentz also hosted the Australia MTV VMAs on March 27, 2009.

Wentz collaborated with Mark Hoppus on the track "In Transit" on the Almost Alice soundtrack for the 2010 movie Alice in Wonderland. He was also a judge for the 10th and 11th annual Independent Music Awards to support independent artists' careers.

Friends or Enemies was a blogging platform created by Wentz to showcase "VIP" content of the bands signed to DCD2. The site first appeared online in the latter half of 2005 stating "coming this fall". On January 16, 2006, the page published its first post, welcoming people to its BETA version; earlier that day Wentz appeared on MTV's TRL wearing a friendsorenemies.com branded t-shirt, to promote the website. The platform allowed its users to customise their own page, comment and reply, and post entries on their profile. In support of Friends or Enemies, William Beckett of The Academy Is... posted on their website that it is "the hatester's MySpace", and Cobra Starship shared a preview of their music video, Church of Hot Addiction on the website, a week before it was to be aired on MTV2. By February 2007, Equalstudio, the designer and host of the website, stated there were over 100,000 members on Friends or Enemies. The website became a hub for posting tour announcements and updates, and had increased its VIP journals to include bands that were not signed to DCD2, such as Armour For Sleep and Innerpartysystem

In 2009, Twitter and Facebook accounts were created, which posted the same content as the website, that was still being regularly updated with blogs and competitions. Also in 2009, Friends or Enemies began posting on their YouTube channel which published skits, live performances and interviews. Through 2011 and 2012, the social media pages began to post links to new music videos, while the website continued with blog updates from bands. Despite 2012 being the year for the website that had amassed the most blog posts, in January 2013, Wentz posted an edited photograph of Britney Spears with a shaved head, which served as his last post. By May 2013, the homepage stated the "Network [is] offline" and has remained down since.

=== Writing ===
Wentz has written a book entitled The Boy with the Thorn in His Side, a story based on nightmares he had as a child. The title is a reference to "The Boy with the Thorn in His Side" on The Smiths' album The Queen Is Dead. Wentz explained that writing books serves as another mode of self-expression other than songwriting: "My inspiration and my ideas don't begin and end at the beginning and the ending of a song. It is too limiting." It was reported that he was to publish another book, entitled Rainy Day Kids, but years went by without any word on the book's progress, and Wentz even expressed on his Twitter account that he did not think it would ever come to fruition. However, in February 2012, he posted a photo on his personal blog of what appeared to be a rough draft of the book's manuscript, explaining that he was currently in the process of editing Rainy Day Kids and that it would be 40–50 pages longer than he originally expected. On December 13, 2012, Wentz revealed the cover for the book, now titled Gray, on his personal blog. The book, which was written with MTV News writer and former FNMTV co-host James Montgomery, was released on February 26, 2013.

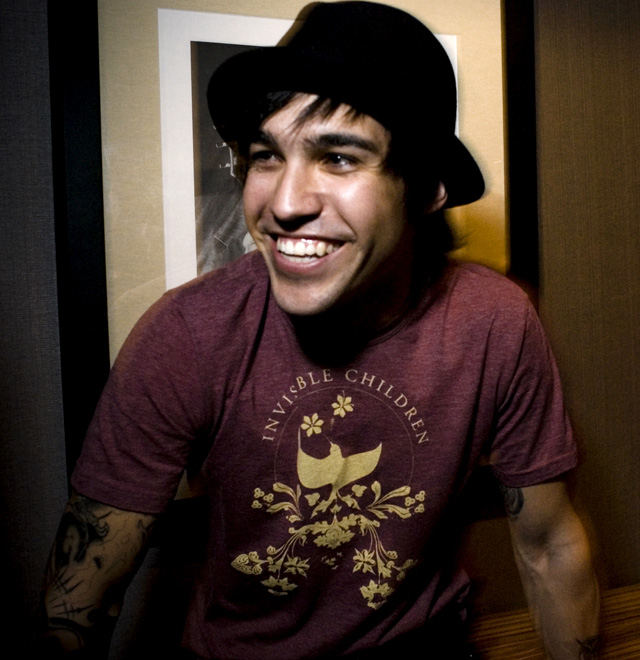
Wentz in 2007

In June 2009, it was announced that Wentz was working on a five-issue comic book mini-series called Fall Out Toy Works, to be published by Image Comics. The idea was conceived by Wentz and designer Darren Romanelli. The plot is loosely based on the Fall Out Boy song "Tiffany Blews" and focuses on "a mysterious toymaker, a cyborg gal named Tiffany and a kid in a bear suit that looks lifted from the cover of Fall Out Boy's Folie á Deux." With writing by Brett Lewis, and art by Sam Basri, the first issue was released on September 2, 2009.

=== Film and television work ===
Wentz also has a film production company called Bartskull Films, which put out the DVD Release the Bats, starring Wentz, his bandmates, and several of his personal friends. Wentz has told several sources that he has all the footage to release a sequel, but editing and time constraints have kept him from doing so, and therefore the fate of the project is still up in the air.

Wentz was in a multi-episode arc of the show One Tree Hill, appearing at Tric (the local all-ages club in Tree Hill) with the entire band. The band first appeared in an episode "An Attempt to Tip the Scales", where they played their single "Dance, Dance" and went on to appear on Peyton and Ellie's (also One Tree Hill's album) tribute album, "Friends with Benefit" to support cancer awareness. Wentz made his first solo cameo in the episode "When It Isn't Like It Should Be" as the romantic interest of Peyton Sawyer, a senior at Tree Hill who had booked the band to play at Tric.

He also made a brief cameo appearance in the show Californication. On February 6, 2008, it was reported that Wentz was the leading candidate for writer Diablo Cody's follow-up film to Juno, Jennifer's Body. The role ended up going to Adam Brody. On February 24, 2008, Wentz appeared in comedian Jimmy Kimmel's video "I'm Fucking Ben Affleck" as a chorus member (along with many other celebrities). The video was in response to one made by Kimmel's then-girlfriend, Sarah Silverman, "I'm Fucking Matt Damon".

In 2009, he made a cameo appearance as himself in Degrassi Goes Hollywood. In 2016, he made a guest appearance on the Nickelodeon series School of Rock.

In 2010, he made a guest appearance on the reality television show The Spin Crowd.

In 2012, he appeared as himself on The Eric Andre Show.

In 2017, Wentz guest starred, with his bandmates, in Cartoon Network's Teen Titans Go! playing himself in the first, third and fourth parts of "The Night Begins to Shine". Their cover of the title song from the special was commercially released.

Wentz hosts the TV show Best Ink. Wentz directed a music video for the song "If It's Love" by American rock band Train. He was a contestant in an episode of the Nickelodeon game show Double Dare.

In 2020, he made a guest appearance on two episodes of the Nickelodeon show All That.

== Personal life ==
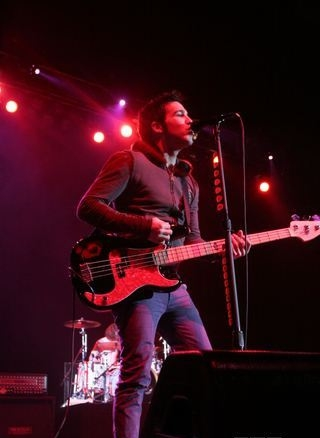
Wentz performing in 2006

Wentz is an atheist. He has bipolar disorder, and has taken medication for it since he was eighteen. In February 2005, Wentz attempted suicide by taking an overdose of the anxiety medication Ativan, and as a result, spent a week in the hospital. Commenting on the event to a magazine, he said:

I was isolating myself further and further, and the more I isolated myself, the more isolated I'd feel. I wasn't sleeping. I just wanted my head to shut off, like, I just wanted to completely stop thinking about anything at all.

The suicide attempt was put into song form, "7 Minutes in Heaven (Atavan Halen)", and released on their album From Under the Cork Tree. After this event, Wentz moved back in with his parents. Wentz later spoke of his suicide attempt to the support site Halfofus.com.

In 2006, Wentz started dating singer Ashlee Simpson. In April 2008, Simpson and Wentz confirmed their engagement, and were married on May 17, 2008, at Simpson's parents' residence in Encino, Los Angeles, with her father officiating the ceremony. Two weeks later, she confirmed her pregnancy. Her surname changed from Simpson to Wentz and she was briefly known professionally as Ashlee Simpson-Wentz. Simpson gave birth to their son on November 20, 2008.

On February 8, 2011, Simpson filed for divorce, citing "irreconcilable differences". She asked for joint custody and primary physical custody of their son with visitation for Wentz, along with spousal support. However, a later report said that Simpson believed the couple simply "married too young", with the source stating that, "It was honestly a classic case of marrying young, having a kid young and growing apart over the years". Wentz reportedly did not want the divorce. Their divorce was finalized on November 22, 2011.

Wentz is currently in a relationship with Meagan Camper. They have two children together, a son born in 2014 and a daughter born in 2018.

=== Philanthropy and activism ===
Wentz is a supporter of Invisible Children, Inc., an organization dedicated to helping the cause of displaced refugees in Uganda. He and Fall Out Boy traveled to the nation, and filmed the music video for the song "I'm Like a Lawyer... (Me & You)" there. Prior to the trip, he participated in an event organized by Invisible Children called "Displace Me", in which 67,000 activists throughout the United States slept in the streets in makeshift cardboard villages, hoping to raise awareness about those displaced by the Ugandan government.

Along with Mary J. Blige and Billy Corgan, Wentz is a spokesperson for The Jed Foundation's Half of Us campaign, a program aimed at lowering the rate of teenage suicide.

Wentz was a vegetarian for many years, associated with the vegan straight edge activist scene known as Hardline during his youth (with three of his bands—Fall Out Boy, Racetraitor, and Birthright—having had releases on Hardline founder Sean Muttaqi's Uprising Records label), and appeared on the ballot of PETA's third annual "Sexiest Vegetarian" awards.

== Discography ==
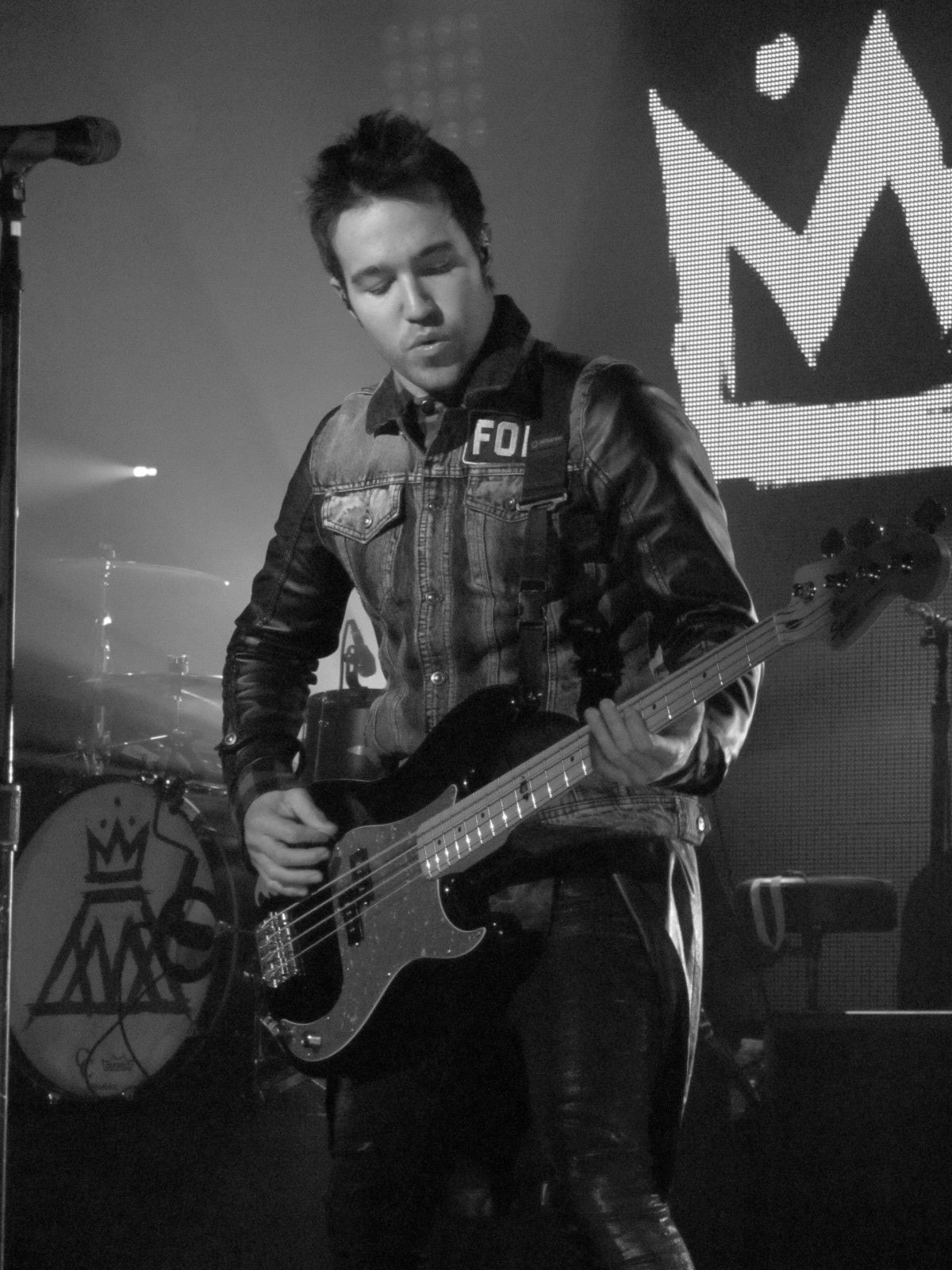
Wentz performing with Fall Out Boy in 2013

=== Arma Angelus ===
- Where Sleeplessness Is Rest from Nightmares (2001)

=== Fall Out Boy ===
- Take This to Your Grave (2003)
- From Under the Cork Tree (2005)
- Infinity on High (2007)
- Folie à Deux (2008)
- Save Rock and Roll (2013)
- American Beauty/American Psycho (2015)
- Mania (2018)
- So Much (For) Stardust (2023)

=== Other work ===
==== Singles ====
Year	Title	Album	Contributions	Other artist(s)	Label
2007	"If You Could Remember"	In This Life or the Next	Vocals	Damnation A.D., Patrick Stump	Victory Records
2007	"One and Only"	Shock Value	Co-writer	Timbaland	Blackground Records
2009	"Catch Me If You Can"	The Quilt	Co-writer	Gym Class Heroes, Patrick Stump	Decaydance, Fueled by Ramen
2009	"You're Not In on the Joke"	Hot Mess	Musician	Cobra Starship	Decaydance, Fueled by Ramen
2010	"In Transit"	Almost Alice	Co-writer, vocals	Mark Hoppus	Buena Vista Records
2020	"Check Your Phone"	Check Your Phone (Single)	Co-writer, vocals	cheapcuts	Lobster Records, Crush Music
2023	"CYAN1DE"	Void Eternal	Co-writer, featured artist	nothing,nowhere.	Fueled by Ramen
2024	"Interlude"	Life's Going Great	Co-writer, vocals	Games We Play	Fueled by Ramen

==== Albums ====
Year	Title	Contributions	Artist	Label
1999	Hypocrisy Breeds Traitors	Bass	Extinction	Catalyst Records
2007	The Live and Learn EP	Vocals	Not Enough Gold	Hewhocorrupts Inc.
