= Nothing,Nowhere =

American rapper and singer (born 1992)

nothing,nowhere.
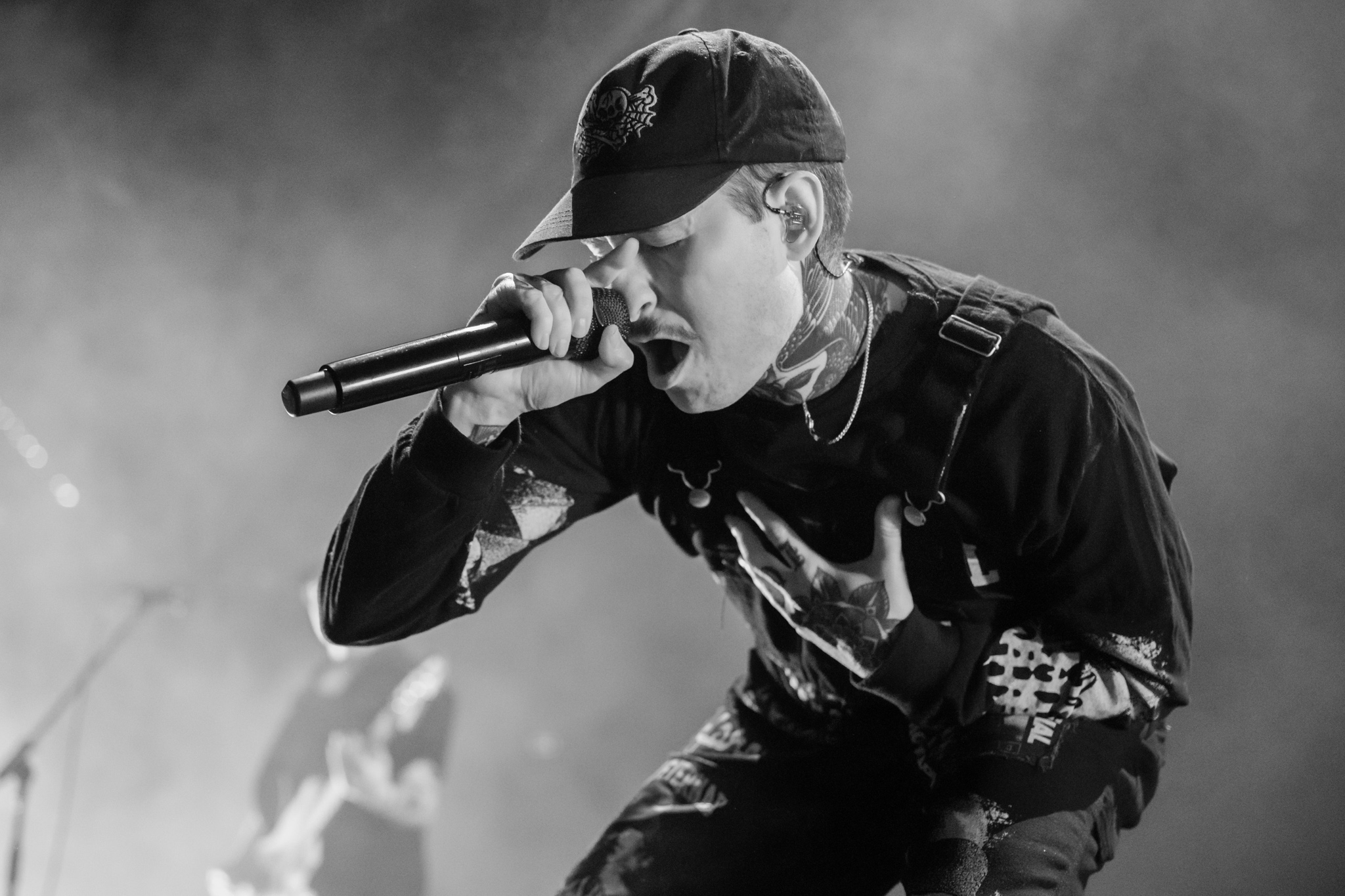
- Mulherin performing in 2023

Background information
- Also known as: n,n. never,forever. TRAU CHOI
- Born: Joseph Edward Mulherin; June 4, 1992 (age 34); Boston, Massachusetts, U.S.
- Origin: Burlington, Vermont, U.S.
- Genres: Emo rap; trap; screamo; alternative rock; indie rock; post-hardcore; emo
- Occupations: Rapper; singer; songwriter; record producer
- Instruments: Vocals; guitar; bass guitar; drums; harmonica
- Years active: 2015–present
- Labels: Reapers Realm; Fueled by Ramen; DCD2; Synergy
- Website: nothingnowhere.net

Joseph Edward Mulherin (born June 4, 1992), better known by his stage name nothing,nowhere., is an American singer, rapper, and multi-instrumentalist.

While the music composed by Mulherin is entirely written and produced by him, he maintains a group of musicians who perform with him for live shows under the "nothing,nowhere." name. The band has toured as a supporting act for Grandson, Real Friends, Tiny Moving Parts, Thrice, La Dispute, Neck Deep, and Fall Out Boy on several tours.

== Early life ==
Mulherin was raised in Foxborough, Massachusetts, and spent summers in Hyde Park, Vermont. He attended Igo Elementary School and Ahern Middle School. Afterwards, Mulherin spent his freshman year of high school at Xaverian Brothers High School, before transferring to Foxborough High School his sophomore year, where he studied computer-based design. He first came into contact with making music at the age of 12, when his cousin let him borrow their acoustic guitar with which he covered various emo songs. For a period of time, Mulherin worked for ice cream company Ben & Jerry's as a videographer, creating numerous advertisements and promotional material.

== History ==
=== Beginning (2015–2017) ===
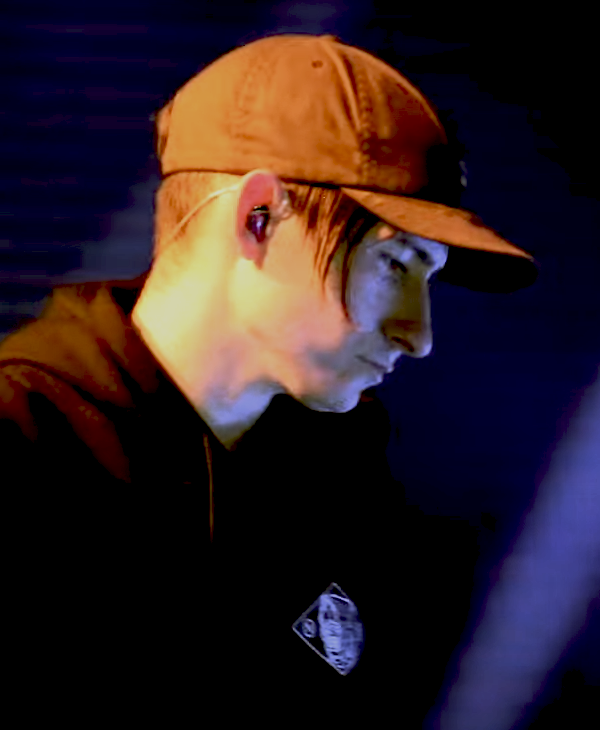
Mulherin in 2018

The origin of the name "nothing,nowhere." comes from Mulherin's inspiration from a lecture by the philosopher Alan Watts on the concept of nothingness and its "fertility".

In 2015, Mulherin began uploading songs on SoundCloud under the name nothing,nowhere. In June of that year, he released his debut album titled the nothing,nowhere. LP onto Bandcamp. After releasing two EPs, Bummer, and Who Are You, featuring Austrian producer Oilcolor, Mulherin debuted several of his most iconic singles of the pre-Fueled by Ramen era, including: Deadbeat Valentine, I'm Sorry, I'm Trying, and Letdown. Then, after appearing on multiple tracks by other Soundcloud artists, on October 20, 2017, he released his commercial debut album, Reaper, which consisted of guitar-based emo rap that the New York Times called "one of the most promising pop albums of the year." He produced the album with Erik Ron and Jay Vee. The track "Hopes Up" features vocals from Chris Carrabba of Dashboard Confessional, and the track "REM" features Delaware rapper Lil West. New York Times music critic Jon Caramanica listed Reaper as his #1 album of 2017.

=== Ruiner and Trauma Factory (2018–2022) ===
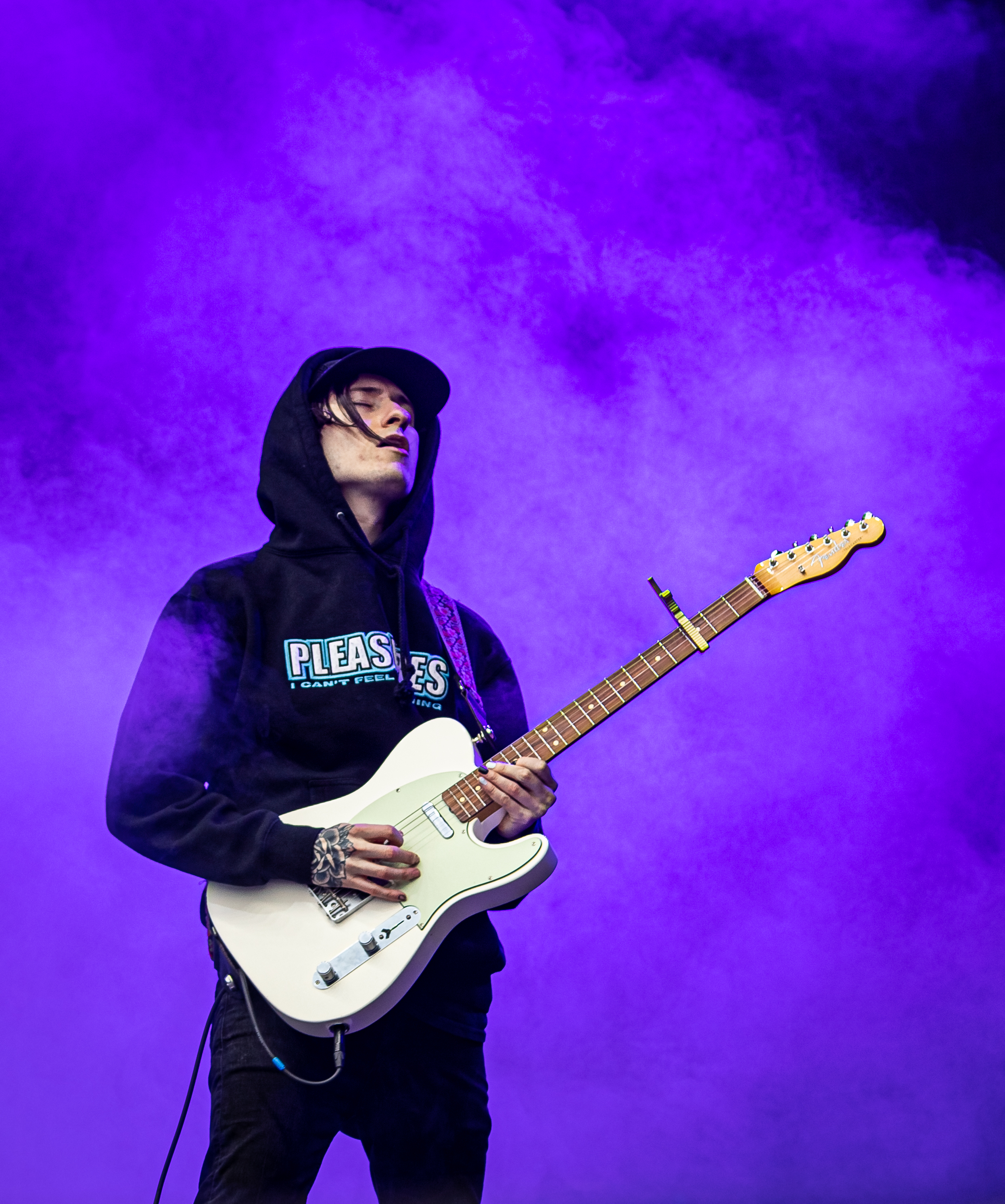
Mulherin performing in 2018

On February 16, 2018, it was confirmed that Mulherin had signed to Fueled by Ramen as he released a new single titled "Ruiner", the first of several that would appear on his upcoming album of the same name, which was released on April 13, 2018. In March 2018, Mulherin cancelled his tour due to chronic laryngitis and a hemorrhaged vocal fold, this included his first European show in London.

From October 19 to November 9, 2018, Mulherin was on tour in Europe.

On January 28, 2020, Mulherin released a new single titled "Nightmare", subsequently announcing dates for a world tour. However, these dates were soon cancelled in March of the same year due to complications involving the COVID-19 pandemic. On April 18, 2020, Mulherin released a single titled "Death". On July 10, 2020, Mulherin released an album titled "One Takes: Vol. 1". The album features versions of songs released prior that were all recorded in one take. Music publication The Line of Best Fit rated it a 7.5/10, calling the album an exposé of "the raw nature of human hurt and understanding". On July 24, 2020, Mulherin released a single titled "Lights (4444)". On September 18, 2020, Mulherin released a single titled "Pretend". On October 5, 2020, Neck Deep announced new dates for their All Distortions Are Intentional US Tour, with Mulherin as a supporting act. On October 27, 2020, Mulherin released a single titled "Blood" featuring indie rock singer KennyHoopla and producer Judge. On December 7, 2020, Mulherin announced his upcoming fourth album, Trauma Factory, which would be released on February 19, 2021. He subsequently released a new single for the album, titled "Fake Friend".

=== Void Eternal, independent releases and touring (2023–present) ===
In 2023, Mulherin released his fifth studio album: Void Eternal. The album received high praise from critics and was described as post-hardcore, nu-metal and emo. The album features artists: Pete Wentz, Underoath, Buddy Nielsen, Freddie Dredd, Silverstein, SeeYouSpaceCowboy and Will Ramos.

On January 20, 2024, Mulherin confirmed that he'd become an independent artist. On social media, he announced that he set himself the target of releasing four albums in 2024. On January 29, 2024, he announced that he would be releasing a new 18-track album called Dark Magic on February 9, 2024, which went back to his earlier sound of emo rap. On June 28, 2024, he released his second album of the year, Hell or Highwater, about which Mulherin said that it was a country album. On October 16, 2024, he released his third album of the year, miserymaker. On December 20, 2024, he released his fourth album of the year, Cult Classic.

In 2025, Mulherin started a brand new social media series titled 'Will It Emo?' Where he makes emo covers of songs by other bands and artists. On February 10, Mulherin announced that he is set to embark on his first US headline tour since 2023, The Return of the Reaper: A Decade of Darkness, his first headlining tour as an independent artist. On March 15, Mulherin released one of his 'Will It Emo?' covers, All Star by Smash Mouth, onto streaming services. On March 28, Mulherin released another one of his covers from his 'Will It Emo?' series, Hot To Go! by Chappell Roan, onto streaming services. On April 7, Mulherin expanded the tour to Europe with dates in the UK, Netherlands, Germany, Czech Republic, France and Belgium. On September 19, Mulherin released will it emo (vol.1), an album featuring ten emo covers of popular songs by artists including, Taylor Swift, One Direction, Rascal Flatts and more.

== Personal life ==
Mulherin has almost never used alcohol, cigarettes or other recreational drugs, and in his freshman year of college, he became vegan straight edge. Mulherin also takes care of hens at his Vermont farmhouse, the eggs from which he gathers and gifts to those visiting his home who are not vegans themselves.

In August 2018, Mulherin cancelled a string of shows, including an appearance at Reading & Leeds Festival due to severe anxiety. He had previously canceled shows due to depression and anxiety in July 2018, further revealing he was pursuing treatment. In an interview with The Fader in November 2018, Mulherin disclosed that he had felt anxiety and panic attacks regularly as a child and the effects it had on his life led to depression.

Before creating music, Mulherin had an interest in filmmaking. He attended film school at Burlington College in Vermont and while in college, Mulherin co-created the short film Watcher which won a prize at the Vermont International Film Festival. In 2013, he participated in a contest by the organization Creative Mind Group at the 66th Cannes Film Festival in France, shooting, directing and co-editing the film One Day which received three awards.

== Discography ==
=== Studio albums ===
==== As nothing,nowhere. ====
Title	Album details
The Nothing,Nowhere LP	Released: June 30, 2015; Formats: LP, Digital download; Label: self-released
Reaper	Released: October 20, 2017; Formats: CD, LP, Digital download; Label: DCD2 Records
Ruiner	Released: April 13, 2018; Formats: CD, LP, Digital download; Label: Fueled by Ramen
Trauma Factory	Released: February 19, 2021; Formats: CD, LP, Digital download; Label: Fueled by Ramen
Void Eternal	Released: March 31, 2023; Formats: CD, LP, TC, Digital download; Label: Fueled by Ramen
Dark Magic (Note: The release has been referred to as both an album and mixtape by the artist himself.)	Released: February 9, 2024; Formats: LP, Digital download; Label: Reapers Realm Records
Hell or Highwater	Released: June 28, 2024; Formats: LP, Digital download; Label: Reapers Realm Records
Miserymaker	Released: October 16, 2024; Formats: LP, Digital download; Label: Reapers Realm Records
Cult Classic	Released: December 20, 2024; Formats: LP, Digital download; Label: Reapers Realm Records

==== As never,forever. ====
never,forever.	Released: October 1, 2013; Re-released: December 11, 2023; Formats: Digital download

=== Live albums ===
Title	Album details
One Takes Vol. 1	Released: July 10, 2020; Formats: Digital download; Label: Fueled by Ramen
Trauma Factory Live	Released: September 2, 2021; Formats: Digital download; Label: Fueled by Ramen

=== Cover albums ===
Title	Album details
Will It Emo? (Vol.1)	Released: September 19, 2025; Formats: Digital download; Label: Reapers Realm Records

=== Extended plays ===
Title	Album details
Bummer	Released: October 22, 2015; Formats: LP, Cassette tape, Digital download; Label: Synergy Records
Who Are You?	Released: January 23, 2016; Formats: LP, Cassette tape, Digital download; Label: Synergy Records
BLOODLUST (with Travis Barker)	Released: September 27, 2019; Formats: CD, Digital download; Label: Fueled By Ramen
The Void Etournal Tape	Released: September 5, 2023; Formats: Cassette tape; Label: Self-released

=== Singles ===
2010s

Year	Title	Album
2015	"Don't Mind Me"	The Nothing,Nowhere. LP
2015	"Poor Posture"	The Nothing,Nowhere. LP
2015	"I've Been Doing Well"	Bummer
2015	"I'm Sorry, I'm Trying"	Non-album singles
2016	"Deadbeat Valentine"	Non-album singles
2016	"Letdown"	Non-album singles
2017	"Clarity in Kerosene"	Reaper
2017	"Hopes Up (featuring Dashboard Confessional)"	Reaper
2017	"Skully"	Reaper
2017	"REM (feat. Lil West)"	Reaper
2018	"waster"	ruiner
2018	"ruiner"	ruiner
2018	"hammer"	ruiner
2018	"rejecter"	ruiner
2018	"dread"	Non-album singles
2018	"Ornament"	Non-album singles
2019	"Call Back"	Non-album singles
2019	"DESTRUCTION (with Travis Barker)"	BLOODLUST

2020s

Year	Title	Album
2020	"nightmare"	Trauma Factory
2020	"death"	Trauma Factory
2020	"lights (4444)"	Trauma Factory
2020	"pretend"	Trauma Factory
2020	"blood"	Trauma Factory
2020	"fake friend"	Trauma Factory
2021	"upside down"	Trauma Factory
2021	"The Swiss Army Romance"	Non-album singles
2021	"Pieces of You"	Non-album singles
2022	"Sledgehammer"	Non-album singles
2022	"MEMORY_FRACTURE"	Void Eternal
2022	"M1SERY_SYNDROME (featuring Buddy Nielsen)"	Void Eternal
2022	"CYAN1DE (featuring Pete Wentz)"	Void Eternal
2022	"Afraid?? [with (sic)boy]"	Non-album single
2023	"THIRST4VIOLENCE (featuring Freddie Dredd & Silverstein)"	Void Eternal
2023	"VEN0M (featuring Underoath)"	Void Eternal
2024	"John Wayne (I Wanna Be a Cowboy)"	Hell or Highwater
2025	"All Star (Smash Mouth cover)"	Will It Emo? (Vol. 1)
2025	"HOT TO GO! (Chappell Roan cover)"	Will It Emo? (Vol. 1)
2025	"Counterfeit"	Non-album singles
2025	"Cardinal In The Crossfire"	Non-album singles

As featured artist

Year	Title	Album
2019	"Lostboy (MISOGI featuring nothing,nowhere.)"	Non-album singles
2019	"Church [Remix] (Fall Out Boy featuring nothing,nowhere.)"	Non-album singles
2020	"No Angel (Oliver Francis featuring nothing,nowhere.)"	Non-album singles
2021	"Universe (Alejandro Aranda featuring nothing,nowhere.)"	Non-album singles
2021	"Hidden (Sullii featuring nothing,nowhere.)"	Non-album singles
2021	"Catching Fire (Sum 41 featuring nothing,nowhere.)"	Non-album singles
2021	"Losing Patience (Illenium featuring nothing,nowhere.)"	Fallen Embers
2021	"Deathwish (Stand Atlantic featuring nothing,nowhere.)"	F.E.A.R
2022	"I'm Not Okay (sadeyes & LiL Xtra featuring nothing,nowhere.)"	Non-album single
2022	"Live Like This (Silverstein featuring nothing,nowhere.)"	Misery Made Me
2023	"backwoods boy (Jay Vee with nothing,nowhere.)"	Non-album single
2023	"Breathing (Magnolia Park & nothing,nowhere.)"	Moon Eater - EP
2023	"Rhythm and Rapture (SeeYouSpaceCowboy & nothing,nowhere.)"	Coup de Grâce
2024	"Forever (weknewnothing & nothing,nowhere.)"	Non-album single
2025	"Hate Me (Sorry My Love Dillon Francis Albert Hype & nothing,nowhere.)"	Non-album single
2025	"Hurt Me Most (weknewnothing & nothing,nowhere.)"	Non-album single

=== Music videos ===
Year	Title	Release
2015	"don't mind me"	the nothing,nowhere. lp
2015	"poor posture"	the nothing,nowhere. lp
2015	"i've been doing well"	Bummer
2015	"i'm sorry, i'm trying"	I'm Sorry, I'm Trying
2016	"Deadbeat Valentine"	Deadbeat Valentine
2016	"letdown"	Letdown
2017	"Clarity in Kerosene"	Reaper
2017	"Hopes Up" (with Dashboard Confessional)	Reaper
2017	"Skully"	Reaper
2018	"REM" (with Lil West)	Reaper
2018	"waster"	ruiner
2018	"ruiner"	ruiner
2018	"hammer"	ruiner
2018	"dread"	dread
2019	"DESTRUCTION" (with Travis Barker)	BLOODLUST
2019	"Lostboy" (MISOGI featuring nothing,nowhere.)	Blood Moon Underworld
2020	"lights (4444)"	Trauma Factory
2020	"death"	Trauma Factory
2020	"pretend"	Trauma Factory
2020	"blood"	Trauma Factory
2020	"nightmare"	Trauma Factory
2021	"upside down"	Trauma Factory
2021	"fake friend"	Trauma Factory
2021	"Pieces of You"	Pieces of You
2021	"deathwish" (Stand Atlantic featuring nothing,nowhere.)	f.e.a.r.
2021	"Catching Fire" (Sum 41 featuring nothing,nowhere.)	Non-album track
2021	"Universe" (Alejandro Aranda featuring nothing,nowhere.)	Los Angeles
2021	"rock bottom" (guccihighwaters featuring nothing,nowhere.)	joke's on you
2022	"Live Like This" (Silverstein featuring nothing,nowhere)	Misery Made Me
2022	"Afraid??" ((sic)boy featuring nothing,nowhere.)	HOLLOW
2022	"MEMORY_FRACTURE"	VOID ETERNAL
2022	"M1SERY_SYNDROME" (with Buddy Nielsen)	VOID ETERNAL
2022	"CYAN1DE" (with Pete Wentz)	VOID ETERNAL
2023	"THIRST4VIOLENCE" (with Freddie Dredd & Silverstein)	VOID ETERNAL
2023	"VEN0M" (with Underoath)	VOID ETERNAL
2023	"Breathing" (Magnolia Park featuring nothing,nowhere.)	MoonEater EP
2024	"Drain Touch"	Dark Magic
2024	"Pity Party"	Dark Magic
2024	"John Wayne (I Wanna Be a Cowboy)"	Hell or Highwater
2024	"the heart mechanic"	miserymaker
2025	"Cardinal In The Crossfire"	Non-album track
