= Angels & Kings =

American nightclub chain

Coordinates: 40°43′41.6″N 73°58′54″W

- Interactive map of Angels & Kings

Restaurant information
- Location: 230 N. Michigan Ave., Chicago, Illinois
- Website: www.angelsandkings.com

Angels & Kings was a nightclub in New York City, New York, located at 500 East 11th Street. The club was opened in 2007 by Bob McLynn and Jonathan Daniel of Crush Management, along with Pete Wentz of Fall Out Boy and several other musicians, including members of Gym Class Heroes, Cobra Starship, and The Academy Is.... It was also known as AK-47. Wentz has stated that he opened the bar in order for his friends and him to have a place to hang out.

Pete Wentz, Perez Hilton, and two business partners opened a second Angels & Kings in Chicago on June 17, 2008. Since then, a third location had opened in Barcelona, and a fourth in Hollywood. In 2011, the Chicago location relocated to the Hard Rock Hotel in the Carbide & Carbon Building. In 2015, the Chicago location was closed.

== History ==
Angels & Kings was opened on April 30, 2007, by Bob McLynn and Jonathan Daniel of Crush Management, along with bassist Pete Wentz and Fall Out Boy. Also involved were Members of the bands Gym Class Heroes, Cobra Starship, and The Academy Is....The club was opened in the space that formerly housed the Orchid Lounge. The grand opening featured Wentz' then-girlfriend and former wife Ashlee Simpson and Tommy Hilfiger among others.

On May 29, 2009, Angels & Kings in New York was shut down by police after it received its third citation within a year of serving alcohol to minors. In April 2012, the New York location was closed down permanently.

== Features ==
The one-room bar in New York featured framed mug shots of Johnny Cash, Jimi Hendrix, Sid Vicious, Lil' Kim, and Frank Sinatra. Also mounted on the wall was a jukebox. The bar also hosted acoustic shows for entertainment.
