= How Will I Rest in Peace if I'm Buried by a Highway? =

Single by KennyHoopla

from the EP How Will I Rest in Peace if I'm Buried by a Highway?
- Released: February 4, 2020
- Recorded: 2019
- Genre: Post-punk; alternative dance; new wave
- Length: 3:38
- Label: Arista
- Songwriter: Kenneth La'ron

KennyHoopla singles chronology
"Sore Loser" (2019)	"How Will I Rest in Peace if I'm Buried by a Highway?" (2020)	"The World Is Flat and This Is the Edge" (2020)

Alternative cover
- Single cover

Music video
- "How Will I Rest in Peace if I'm Buried by a Highway?" on YouTube

"How Will I Rest in Peace if I'm Buried by a Highway?" (stylized in all lowercase) is a song by American musician Kenneth La'ron, under the name KennyHoopla. It was released as the self-titled single from the EP of the same name on February 4, 2020 through Arista Records. It was KennyHoopla's first single to receive significant radio attention and to chart, reaching number 8 on the Billboard Alternative Airplay chart.

== Background and release ==
The track was written and recorded in mid-to-late 2019 and written by La'ron. When describing the song and the songwriting process, La'ron said "There's an aura about indie rock music, and a sound and energy that I can't explain, but I feel like I have it in me. It was cool that it came out and other people are feeling it. It was written in a place in which I felt super doubtful".

The song and the corresponding was released on February 4, 2020, for streaming and radio platforms.

== Music and lyrics ==
The song is performed in a E major key. It is performed in a 4/4 time signature at a tempo of 160 beats per minute, although it can be altered to a half-time of 80 beats per minute.

== Commercial performance ==
"How Will I Rest in Peace if I'm Buried by a Highway?" became La'ron's first single to chart, ultimately reaching the number eight spot in the Billboard magazine's Alternative Airplay chart in July 2020.

== Music video ==
The music video for the single was also released on February 4, 2020. The video transitions between scenes of La'ron singing along on a checkboard dance floor, a crowded house party, and by a vehicle that has crashed alongside a rural road. The music video was directed by Cody LaPlant and Damien Blue.

== Track listing ==
All tracks are written by Kenneth La'ron.

No.	Title	Length
1.	"How Will I Rest in Peace if I'm Buried by a Highway?"	3:38
2.	"Plastic Door"	2:50
Total length:		6:11

== Chart positions ==
Chart (2020)	Peak position
US Alternative Airplay (Billboard)	8
US Hot Rock & Alternative Songs (Billboard)	39
Canada Rock (Billboard)	15

== Personnel ==
Music video

The following individuals were credited with editing, director, and filming the music video:

- Cody LaPlant & Damien Blue — Director, Editor, Color
- Kyle Kadow — Cinematographer
- Emmanuil Morari — First assistant camera
- Spencer Ortega — Gaffer
- Xavier Whitaker, Steven Cleavland, and Eddie Barrioneuvo — Grip
- Will Storm — Art director
- Asher Klaven — Assistant art director
- Brema Brema — Behind the scenes
