= KennyHoopla =

American musician (born 1997)

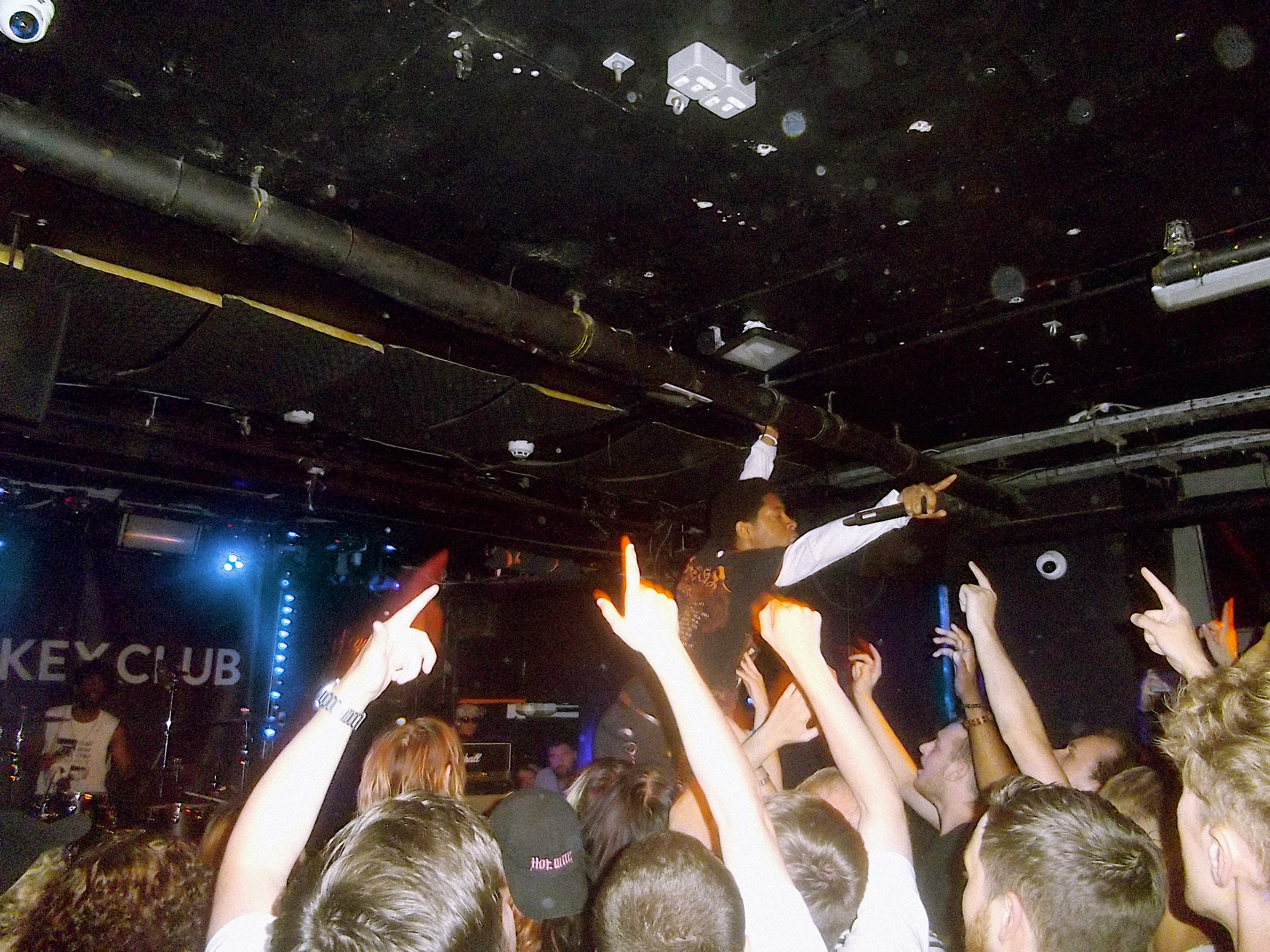
- KennyHoopla performing in 2022

Background information
- Born: Kenneth La'ron Beasley; August 5, 1997 (age 29); Cleveland, Ohio, U.S.
- Genres: Indie rock; pop punk
- Occupation: Singer-songwriter
- Years active: 2016–present
- Labels: Mogul Vision; Arista; The Orchard; Garbage Hill
- Website: kennyhoopla.com

Kenneth La'ron Beasley (born August 5, 1997), known by his stage name KennyHoopla, is an American indie rock singer, songwriter and musician. He is primarily known from his singles "How Will I Rest in Peace if I'm Buried by a Highway?" and "Estella". He released his commercial debut EP How Will I Rest in Peace if I'm Buried by a Highway? on May 15, 2020.

== Early life ==
La'ron was born in Cleveland, Ohio. He moved to Oshkosh, Wisconsin as a child. He spent a large part of his youth in-between the two cities. When asked about his earliest musical memory in an interview with DIY magazine, La'ron recalled recording a "horrible" freestyle rap on a cassette toy his mother gave him when he was around 10 years old.

== Music career ==
=== 2016–2019: Beneath the Willow Tree and other singles ===
KennyHoopla began posting songs to his SoundCloud page in 2016. On October 5, 2016, he released an EP titled Beneath the Willow Tree to SoundCloud, which consisted of some of the tracks he had posted throughout the year, as well as some new songs. The EP received acclaim from several music blogs, who considered him an artist to watch. On October 26, he uploaded the song "Cave" to SoundCloud, which became his most streamed song on the site at the time.

On August 6, 2017, he released his commercial debut single "Waves", along with a music video. This was followed by "Sickness" in 2018. In 2018, he signed with Arista Records. On February 1, 2019, he released the single "Lost Cause", which became his most popular song at the time and gained him more exposure. Its music video was released on February 6. This was followed by "Sore Loser" on September 18, which was also positively received.

=== 2020–present: How Will I Rest in Peace if I'm Buried by a Highway? and Survivors Guilt: The Mixtape ===
On February 4, 2020, KennyHoopla released the single "How Will I Rest in Peace if I'm Buried by a Highway?" This track quickly became his most popular song to date, becoming his first song to reach 1 million views on YouTube, and garnering praise for its unique post-punk and new wave inspired sound. The track also received radio play on alternative music stations, and peaked at number 8 on the Billboard Alternative Airplay chart. On March 12, he released the follow-up single, "The World is Flat and This is the Edge".

On May 13, 2020, he released the single "Plastic Door", and announced that his EP How Will I Rest in Peace if I'm Buried by a Highway? would be released that Friday, May 15. The EP received critical acclaim, being praised for its versatile mixture of sounds such as indie rock, hip hop, pop punk, and drum and bass. On August 28, he released a reworked version of his 2019 single "Lost Cause", featuring guest vocals from Grandson. On October 14, he released another version of the song, this time featuring guest vocals from Jesse Rutherford of The Neighbourhood.

On October 12, 2020, he revealed that he is working on his debut album. Two days later, on October 14, he posted a picture to his Twitter account of him in the studio with Blink-182 drummer Travis Barker. On November 20, he released the song "Estella", which features Barker on drums. Its music video was released five days later, on November 25.

On May 7, 2021, he released the single "Hollywood Sucks" featuring Travis Barker, and announced the release of his mixtape Survivors Guilt: The Mixtape on June 11.

KennyHoopla is scheduled to support Yungblud in London on his Occupy the UK tour in 2021, and Machine Gun Kelly on his 2021 Tickets to My Downfall U.S. tour, alongside Jxdn and Carolesdaughter.

In 2022 he released the rap-influenced single "DIRTY WHITE VANS". He released further singles throughout 2023 before parting ways with Arista Records. He independently released the single "ONE TULIP" in summer 2024.

On May 30 2025, he released the three-song EP rebirth // renaissance, followed by EP Conditions of an Orphan on September 19, 2025. The EP was produced by Paramore’s Zac Farro. In an interview with The Luna Collective, La’ron described the release as “getting up to get back in the fight” after getting knocked down by the music industry. The title references the loss of his mother and lack of mentors in his life at the moment.

KennyHoopla opened for Soft Play on tour in September 2025, and embarked on a 9 date headline tour of the U.S. in November. In October 2025, KennyHoopla announced a UK and Ireland headline tour in support of Conditions of an Orphan. The tour will include dates in Glasgow, Manchester, London, and Bristol, with support from the band girlfriends.

== Musical style ==
La'ron's music has been categorised as indie rock, and pop punk, often incorporating elements of new wave and dance-punk.

== Discography ==
=== Mixtapes ===
Title	Details
Survivors Guilt: The Mixtape (with Travis Barker)	Released: June 11, 2021; Label: Arista Records, Mogul Vision; Format: Digital download, streaming

=== Extended plays ===
Title	Details
Beneath the Willow Tree	Released: October 5, 2016; Label: Self-released; Format: Digital download
How Will I Rest in Peace if I'm Buried by a Highway?	Released: May 15, 2020; Label: Arista Records, Mogul Vision; Format: Digital download, streaming
Blink and You'll Miss It (with Travis Barker)	Released: July 7, 2023; Label: Arista Records, Mogul Vision; Format: Digital download, streaming
Rebirth//Renaissance	Released: May 30, 2025; Label: The Orchard, Garbage Hill; Format: Digital download, streaming
Conditions of An Orphan	Released: September 19, 2025; Label: The Orchard, Garbage Hill; Format: Digital download, streaming

=== Singles ===
Title	Year	Peak chart positions			Album
Title	Year	US Alt.	US Rock	CAN Rock	Album
"Waves"	2017	—	—	—	Non-album singles
"Sickness"	2018	—	—	—	Non-album singles
"Lost Cause" (solo, with Grandson, or featuring Jesse)	2019	—	—	—	Non-album singles
"Sore Loser"	2019	—	—	—	How Will I Rest in Peace if I'm Buried by a Highway?
"How Will I Rest in Peace if I'm Buried by a Highway?"	2020	8	39	15	How Will I Rest in Peace if I'm Buried by a Highway?
"The World Is Flat and This Is the Edge"	2020	—	—	—	How Will I Rest in Peace if I'm Buried by a Highway?
"Plastic Door"	2020	—	—	—	How Will I Rest in Peace if I'm Buried by a Highway?
"Estella" (with Travis Barker)	2020	8	41	22	Survivors Guilt: The Mixtape
"Hollywood Sucks" (with Travis Barker)	2021	23	— (Note: "Hollywood Sucks" did not enter the Hot Rock & Alternative Songs chart, but peaked at number 42 on the Rock & Alternative Airplay chart.)	—	Survivors Guilt: The Mixtape
"Dirty White Vans" (solo or with Wiz Khalifa)	2022	—	—	—	Non-album singles
"You Needed a Hit?"	2023	—	—	—	Non-album singles
"Sabotage" (with Travis Barker)	2023	—	—	—	Blink and You'll Miss It
"Keep A Window Open"	2023	—	—	—	Non-album singles
"One Tulip"	2024	—	—	—	Non-album singles
"Northern Lights"	2025	—	—	—	Rebirth//Renaissance
"Ashes to Ashes"	2025	—	—	—	Rebirth//Renaissance
"Even As If Never"	2025	—	—	—	Rebirth//Renaissance
"Orphan"	2025	—	—	—	Conditions of An Orphan
"New America"	2026	—	—	—	TBA
"—" denotes a recording that did not chart or was not released in that territory.

==== As featured artist ====
Title	Year	Album
"Blood" (Nothing,Nowhere featuring KennyHoopla & Judge)	2020	Trauma Factory
"See You When The End's Near" (Day Wave featuring KennyHoopla)	2022	Pastlife
"Dancing on My Grave" (Groupthink featuring KennyHoopla)	2023	Before the Afters
"Hello" (Grouplove featuring KennyHoopla)	2023	Non-album single
"Keep It Rolling" (Bloc Party featuring KennyHoopla)	2023	The High Life EP

== Tours ==
=== Headlining ===
- Survivors Guilt Tour (2022)
- Home for the Holidays (2022)
- Raised By Wolves (2023)

=== Supporting ===
- Yungblud - Occupy the UK Tour (2021)
- Machine Gun Kelly - Tickets to My Downfall Tour (2021) (Later was off tour)
- Blink-182 - World Tour (2023/2024)
