= Void Eternal =

Studio album by nothing,nowhere.
- Released: March 31, 2023
- Recorded: 2021–2023
- Studio: Reaper Ranch Studios, Sheldon, US
- Genre: Post-hardcore; emo; screamo; nu-metal; metalcore
- Length: 42:30
- Label: Fueled By Ramen
- Producer: Joe Mulherin; Erik Ron

Nothing,nowhere. chronology
Trauma Factory (2021)	Void Eternal (2023)	Dark Magic (2024)

Singles from Void Eternal
- 1. "MEMORY_FRACTURE" Released: July 16, 2022; 2. "M1SERY_SYNDROME" Released: August 26, 2022; 3. "CYAN1DE" Released: November 4, 2022; 4. "THIRST4VIOLENCE" Released: February 3, 2023; 5. "VEN0M" Released: March 31, 2023

Void Eternal (stylised as VOID ETERNAL) is the fifth studio album by American rapper nothing,nowhere. It was released on March 31, 2023, on Fueled by Ramen.

== Release ==
The album was announced on February 3, 2023, following the release of the single: THIRST4VIOLENCE. The album was then released on CD, digital download and streaming on March 31, 2023, with vinyl variants released in June.

=== Singles ===
The first single from the album MEMORY_FRACTURE was released on July 16, 2022. The single was followed by M1SERY_SYNDROME, which was released on August 26, 2022, prior to a North American tour. The third single, featuring Pete Wentz, CYAN1DE was released in support of a European tour, on which Mulherin revealed he had finished recording his new album. The single THIRST4VIOLENCE was released on February 3, 2023, alongside the announcement of the album.

== Track listing ==
Void Eternal
No.	Title	Writer(s)	Length
1.	"Anxiety"	Joe Mulherin; Blake Hardman; Cody Stewart	3:26
2.	"Tragedy" (featuring Will Ramos)	Mulherin; Hardman; Brody McKeegan; Stewart; Taylor Morgan; Will Ramos	3:25
3.	"Psycho Psychiatry" (featuring SEEYOUSPACECOWBOY)	Mulherin; Hardman; McKeegan; Stewart; Bert Moreshead; Connie Sgarbossa	3:48
4.	"Chromakiller"	Mulherin; Stewart	3:41
5.	"Suicide Pact"	Mulherin; Hardman; Stewart; Moreshead	3:38
6.	"Thirst4Violence" (featuring Freddie Dredd & Silverstein)	Mulherin; Hardman; McKeegan; Stewart; Moreshead; Ryan Mitchel Chisels; Shane Told; Morgan	2:19
7.	"Cyanide" (featuring Pete Wentz)	Mulherin; Stewart; Pete Wentz	3:51
8.	"Eraser"	Mulherin; Stewart	3:18
9.	"Fortune Teller" (featuring Static Dress)	Mulherin; Stewart; Oliver Appleyard	3:22
10.	"Misery Syndrome" (featuring Buddy Nielsen)	Mulherin; Hardman; Buddy Nielsen; Stewart; Moreshead; David Beissner	3:04
11.	"Venom" (featuring Underoath)	Mulherin; Aaron Gillespie; Erik Ron; Jackson Lee Morgan; William Spencer Chamberlain	3:50
12.	"Memory Fracture"	Mulherin	4:18
Total length:			42:30

=== Notes ===
- All tracks are stylized in all caps
- "Psycho Psychiatry", "Suicide Pact", "Fortune Teller", "Misery Syndrome", and "Memory Fracture" are stylized with an underscore between the two words
- "Anxiety", "Tragedy", and "Chromakiller" are stylized with the number 3 in place of the letter E
- "Anxiety", "Cyanide", and "Misery Syndrome" are stylized with the number 1 in place of the letter I
- "Chromakiller", "Fortune Teller", and "Venom" are stylized with the number 0 in place of the letter O
- "Eraser" is stylized with the number 4 in place of the letter A

== Personnel ==
Credits for Void Eternal adapted from liner notes.

=== Musicians ===
- Joe Mulherin - vocals (all), guitars (all), bass (all), programming (all), production (1–10, 12)
- Cody Stewart - drums (1–10, 12)
- Will Ramos - guest vocals (2)
- SEEYOUSPACECOWBOY - guest performance (3)
- Freddie Dredd - guest vocals (6)
- Silverstein - guest vocals (6)
- Pete Wentz - guest vocals (7)
- Static Dress - guest performance (9)
- Buddy Nielsen - guest vocals (10)
- Underoath - guest performance (11)

=== Additional personnel ===
- Chris Athens - mastering (all)
- Austin Coupe - vocal mixing (all)
- Vincent James Weight - production (9)
- Erik Ron - production (11)

== Critic reception ==
Professional ratings
Review scores
Source	Rating
Distorted Sound Magazine	6/10
Bring the Noise	10/10
Line of Best Fit	8/10

Void Eternal received generally positive reviews from critics. In his review for The Line of Best Fit, Steven Loftin said the album "is a rebirth [of nu-metal]", and Ely King for Distorted Sound said Mulherin has "successfully branched himself into metalcore" and was "very reminiscent of the early to mid-00s era".

=== Commercial success ===
On a Twitch stream, Mulherin said the album was not a commercial success. He stated he lost 1.2 million monthly listeners on Spotify after the release of the album and would most likely not release a metal album again due to the lack of commercial success.
