= Reaper (album) =

Studio album by Nothing,Nowhere
- Released: October 20, 2017
- Genre: Rap rock, emo rap
- Length: 33:45
- Label: DCD2
- Producer: Erik Ron

Nothing,Nowhere chronology
The Nothing,Nowhere LP (2017)	Reaper (2017)	Ruiner (2018)

Reaper is the second studio album by American rapper nothing,nowhere. It was released on October 20, 2017, by DCD2 Records, making it his first studio album released on a label.

== Track listing ==
Reaper track listing
No.	Title	Writer(s)	Length
1.	"Houdini"	Joe Mulherin
2.	"Clarity in Kerosene"	Mulherin
3.	"Funeral Fantasy"	Mulherin
4.	"REM" (featuring Lil West)	Mulherin; Maclean Porter
5.	"Black Heart"	Mulherin
6.	"Marykate"	Mulherin
7.	"Hopes Up" (featuring Dashboard Confessional)	Mulherin; Chris Carrabba
8.	"Skully"	Mulherin
9.	"Nevermore"	Mulherin
Total length:			33:45

== Critical reception ==
Professional ratings
Review scores
Source	Rating
Rolling Stone	3/5 stars
The New York Times	Positive

Reaper was released to limited critical reviews upon its release. Mosi Reeves, writing for Rolling Stone gave Reaper three stars out of five, saying that "Nothing,Nowhere. isn't a revelatory rapper or singer, but seamless blend of the two that makes Reaper stand out". Jon Caramanica, writing for The New York Times, praised the album. Caramanica described the album as "an outstanding album that synthesizes the second-wave emo of the early to mid-2000s with the rattling hip-hop low end of the last few years. It is one of the most promising pop albums of the year; the logical, and perhaps inevitable, endpoint of hip-hop’s broad diffusion into every corner of American musical life; and also the most viable current direction for guitar-driven music in the mainstream."
