= Clandestine Industries =

American clothing company

- The Clandestine Industries "Bartskull" logo.
- Industry: Apparel
- Founded: 2006, 2023
- Defunct: 2012
- Headquarters: Chicago, Illinois
- Key people: Pete Wentz (founder)
- Products: Apparel, jewelry, accessories

Clandestine Industries is a brand and clothing company owned by Pete Wentz, bassist of Fall Out Boy, and partners. It was active from 2006 to 2012, and then was brought back in 2023. The brand primarily releases clothing and accessories, as well as Wentz's self-published media.

The brand's logo is a “bartskull” (a bat/heart/skull).This design came from reoccurring nightmares that Wentz had as a child. It is commonly known for being a tattoo of his, designed by Nick Scimeca.

== History and products ==
Clandestine Industries was formed in 2006 by Wentz, who published his first book, The Boy With A Thorn In His Side, through the company. After Wentz found success with the book, he decided to expand the company to design and sell clothing. Previously, Wentz's Fueled by Ramen and Decaydance labels had released a DVD entitled Release The Bats on June 11, 2005. The cover art stated the film was "presented by Clandestine Industries", suggesting the company had been mapped out since at least 2004.

From its initial inception, Clandestine Industries released limited-edition tees, hoodies, and accessories such as belts and jewelry, most embellished with the brand's trademark 'bartskull' logo. They also worked alongside companies such as DKNY Jeans, Wet Seal and Nordstrom. In 2007, a Clandestine Industries Landmark retail store, which contained exclusive store-only garments, opened in Pete's hometown of Chicago. In February 2009, Clandestine Industries relaunched its website and debuted a new collection entitled, "Don't Call It A Comeback," and immediately sold out of items only an hour after the release. The line was primarily sold on the brand's website, at the Landmark, and occasionally alongside merchandise at Fall Out Boy shows. Wentz, along with other musicians from the emo circuit such as Gabe Saporta, Travie McCoy, Patrick Stump, and Mikey Way, often advertised his range by wearing the products in public; most famously the Stay Gold hoodie and the Please Call Gabe Saporta t-shirt. The latter item did not display Saporta's actual contact details, but workers from the production company employed by Wentz later leaked them publicly.

On June 27, 2010, the Chicago Landmark store closed. On Wentz's blog, he explained that the closing of the Landmark would aid in expanding the brand's webstore.

In June 2011, the website was relaunched with a brand new summer range. Wentz commented on his blog, "this is what the original intention of Clandestine was".

Despite no formal announcement of Clandestine's shutdown, the brand's Tumblr, Facebook, and Twitter accounts were abandoned around 2012. Items from the brand’s original releases are rare due to their limited production, though they occasionally appear on resale platforms such as eBay and Livejournal.

On November 7, 2023, Wentz posted a photo on instagram with the caption ''Now with a working link clandestineindustries.com'', announcing that Clandestine Industries had returned with new clothing items. A number of limited releases have followed, through the brand’s official website.
