= Ruiner (Nothing,Nowhere album) =

Studio album by Nothing,Nowhere
- Released: April 13, 2018
- Genre: Emo rap, indie rock, emo
- Length: 33:06
- Label: Fueled by Ramen

Nothing,Nowhere chronology
Reaper (2017)	Ruiner (2018)	Bloodlust (2019)

Singles from Ruiner
- 1. "Hammer" Released: March 2, 2018

Professional ratings
Review scores
Source	Rating
Dead Press!	8/10 stars
Pitchfork	5.6/10
The Soundboard	5/10
Stars and Scars	Positive
Upset	4/5 stars

Ruiner is the third studio album by American rapper nothing,nowhere. The album was released on April 13, 2018 through Fueled by Ramen.

== Track listing ==
All music is composed by Joseph Edward Mulherin.

No.	Title	Length
1.	"Outsider"	1:23
2.	"Reminiscer"	3:28
3.	"Better"	3:26
4.	"Sinker"	3:01
5.	"Hammer"	3:24
6.	"Rejecter"	4:09
7.	"Ruiner"	3:04
8.	"Sayer"	3:23
9.	"Vacanter"	2:29
10.	"Changer"	2:29
11.	"Waster"	2:50
Total length:		33:06
