= Chicago hardcore =

US hardcore punk scene

Chicago hardcore is the hardcore punk scene of Chicago and its surrounding area. It began in the 1980s with post-hardcore bands Naked Raygun, Big Black and the Effigies. By the 1990s, the scene had developed two separate sizable scenes: a straight edge metalcore scene including Arma Angelus and Racetraitor; and a thrashcore scene based on the South Side, including Los Crudos and Charles Bronson. During this time, Victory Records was founded in the city. They would go on to be one of the most prominent record labels in hardcore, releasing albums by seminal metalcore bands Integrity, Hatebreed and All Out War, as well as emo and pop-punk groups including Taking Back Sunday, Hawthorne Heights and A Day to Remember. Chicago hardcore experienced a mainstream crossover in the 2000s, when bands originating from the scene, including Rise Against, Fall Out Boy and the Lawrence Arms, received international success.

== History ==
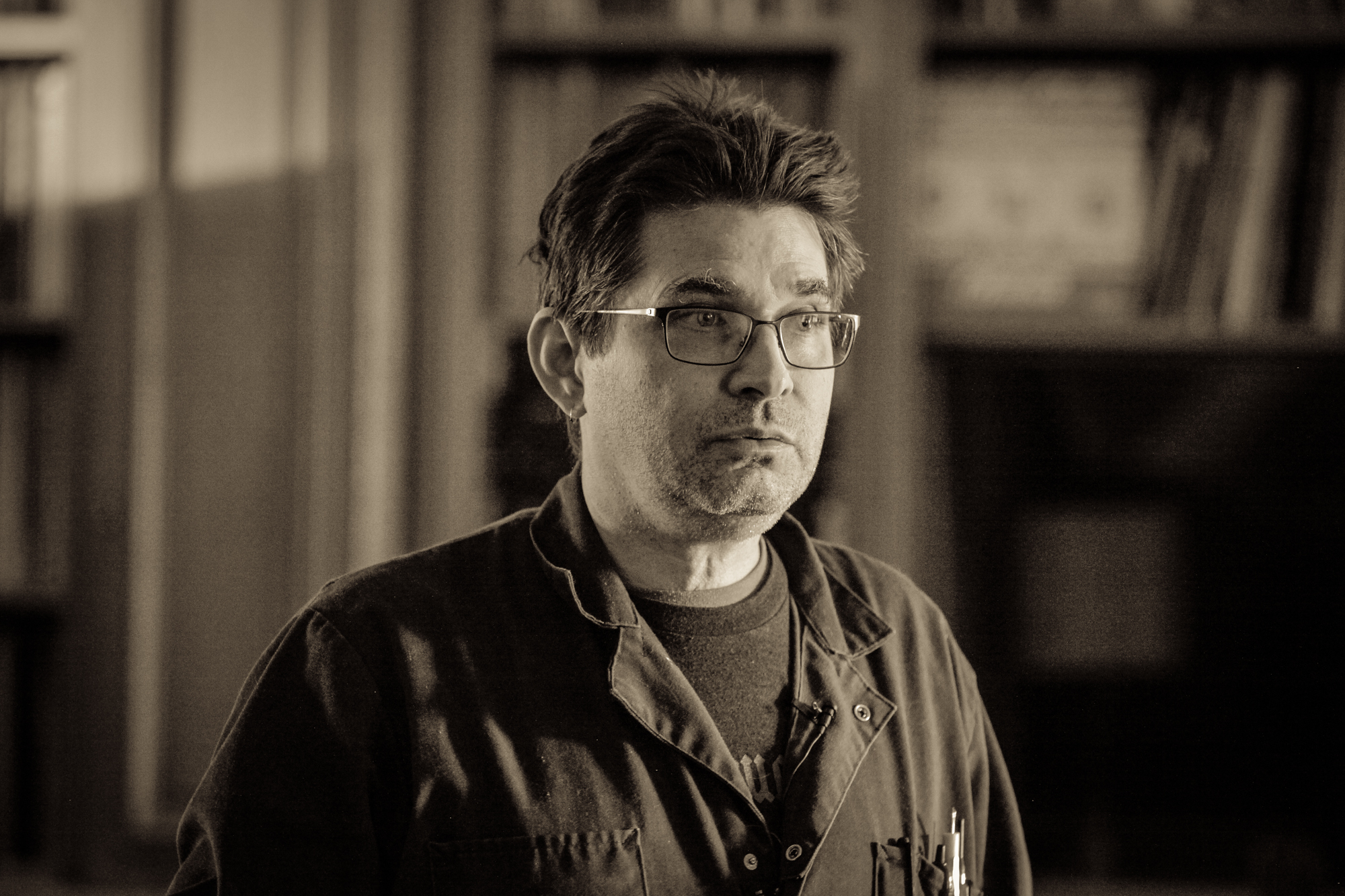
Steve Albini, a member of influential Chicago post-hardcore bands Big Black, Rapeman and Shellac

=== Origins (1980s) ===
Naked Raygun, Big Black and the Effigies were popular at the emerging of the hardcore scene. These acts have also been seen as important to the development of the post-hardcore genre, as well as for fusing the hardcore sound with influences from the late 1970s and early 1980s British post-punk scene

During the 1980s, the majority of Chicago hardcore shows were held at Medusa's, at 3275 North Sheffield Avenue. Many of these events were organized by promoter Sean Duffy, who employed physically abusive security and inflated prices. At a Duffy organised event headlined by a number of Revelation Records in the Summer of 1989, the bands were paid insufficiently. After word spread of this, many touring bands refrained from playing the city. In reaction, Ben Weasel started booking shows at Durty Nelly's in Palatine which instead became the centre of the local scene. By the end of the decade, touring bands began playing the area again, instead playing Mcgregor's in Elmhurst.

=== Developments (1990s) ===
==== Straight edge metalcore ====
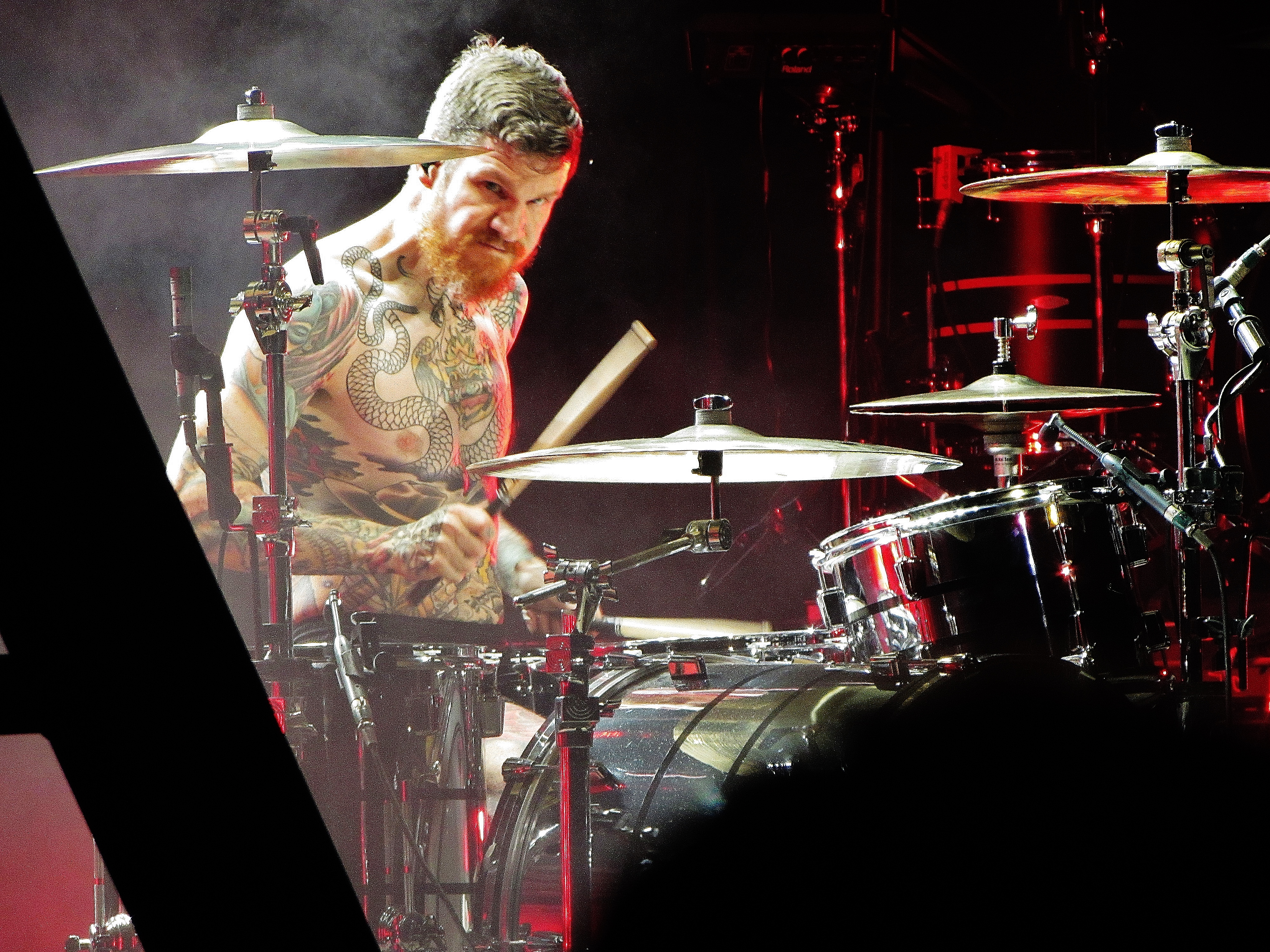
Andy Hurley, drummer for Chicago metalcore bands Arma Angelus and Racetraitor

In 1989, Tony Brummel opened the venue Club Blitz at 417 North Cass Avenue in Westmont. At the time, Brummel was the vocalist of Chicago's first straight edge band Only the Strong, who quickly became prominent figures in the scene and his venue became of the main locations for local bands. Only the Strong soon morphed into Even Score, and Brummel founded Victory Records. The number of straight edge bands increased significantly by the early 1990s. These bands originally played fast punk-leaning hardcore. In the following years, this scene became increasingly influenced by Integrity from Cleveland, leading to the embrace of slower tempos and influence from heavy metal by bands including Even Score and Bloodthirst. Perceiving the Brummel and Victory Records scene as unwelcoming, a younger group of bands including Icepick, Restraint, Corner Stone and Silence dissociated themselves from them. These continued playing their metal-influenced style.

By the mid-1990s, Chicago's hardcore scene had waned. The scene's most popular band at the time was Everlast, who would often only play to twenty people. Concerts became more infrequent, with as long as six months between shows. Because of this, Jim Grimes, vocalist for Extinction, and Carey Housen began booking. By the end of the decade, bands including Arma Angelus, Racetraitor, the Killing Tree and Extinction were fronting this scene and touring nationally.

==== Thrashcore ====
Bands on the South Side of Chicago including Los Crudos, Charles Bronson, Mob Action and Insult to Injury continued the faster, punk-leaning style of hardcore outside the straight edge scene. One of the few crossovers between this scene and the straight edge metalcore scene was MK-Ultra, who were a prominent metalcore band in their own right and included multiple members of Silence. By mid-1990s, they had seen Los Crudos live, which led them to view the politics of the straight edge scene as shallow. Subsequently, MK-Ultra embraced the influence of the bands from the South Side and begun to play fast, punk-leaning hardcore.

=== Mainstream crossover and decline (early 2000s) ===
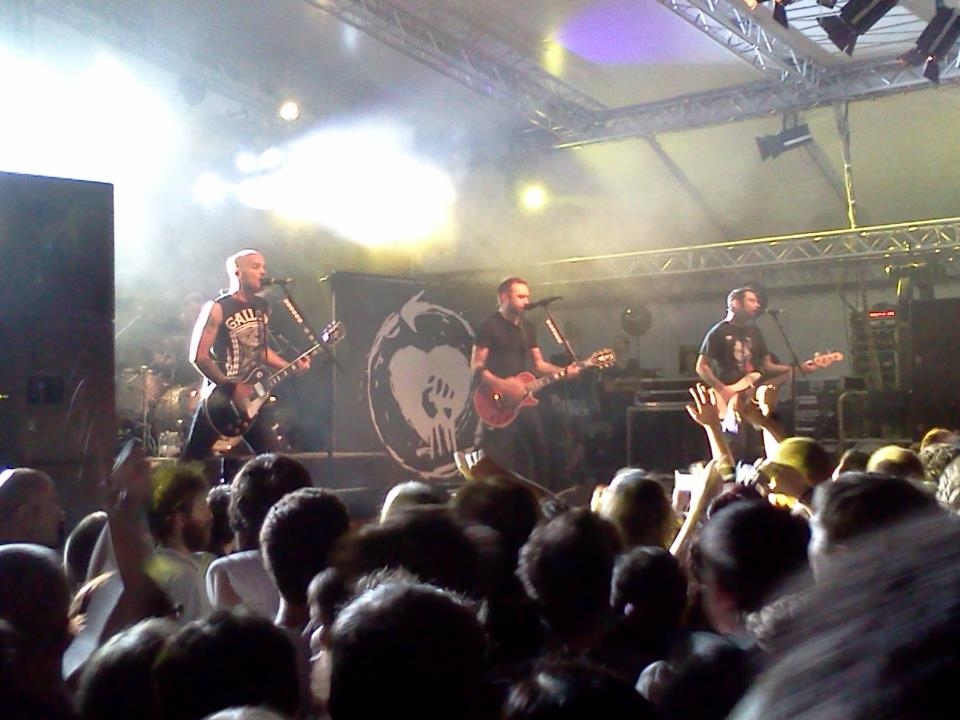
Chicago melodic hardcore band Rise Against achieved mainstream success in the 2000s

Rise Against was founded under the name Transistor Revolt by former members of Arma Angelus, Yellow Road Priest, Baxter and 88 Fingers Louie. They pursued a more melodic take on hardcore. Fall Out Boy was formed in 2001 by members of Chicago hardcore groups such as Arma Angelus, Racetraitor, Extinction, and Yellow Road Priest wishing to explore a more pop-centric and radio friendly sound. Around this same time, former Racetraitor and Killtheslavemaster and future-Fall Out Boy drummer Andy Hurley, along with members of 7 Angels 7 Plagues and Vegan Reich, formed Project Rocket, a similar departure into more accessible music.

=== Underground revival (late 2000s–present) ===
In recent years, the scene has had a wave of heavy, down-tuned hardcore bands come into the national and international spotlight. Harm's Way, No Zodiac, and Weekend Nachos hail from Chicago. Harm's Way is signed to Deathwish Inc. and has toured with Backtrack, Expire, and Suburban Scum. Weekend Nachos, with their powerviolence sound, has been signed to Relapse Records.

== See also ==
- Chicago Record Labels
- List of Chicago hardcore punk bands
- Music of Chicago
- Music of Illinois
- You Weren't There: A History of Chicago Punk 1977-1984 (dir. Joe Losurdo and Christina Tillman) (2007) - Documentary
