= List of Chicago hardcore punk bands =

This is a list of notable hardcore punk bands from Chicago, Illinois and its surrounding areas.

- 88 Fingers Louie
- Arma Angelus
- Articles of Faith
- Bhopal Stiffs
- The Bollweevils
- Charles Bronson
- The Fighters
- Harm's Way
- Hewhocorrupts
- The Killing Tree
- Los Crudos
- Masters of the Obvious
- Pegboy
- Racetraitor
- Rise Against
- Screeching Weasel (early)
- Weekend Nachos
