= Audience of One (song) =

2009 single by Rise Against

Single by Rise Against

from the album Appeal to Reason
- Released: March 3, 2009
- Recorded: January–June 2008
- Studio: The Blasting Room (Fort Collins, Colorado)
- Length: 4:06
- Label: Interscope
- Songwriter: Rise Against
- Producers: Jason Livermore; Bill Stevenson

Rise Against singles chronology
"Re-Education (Through Labor)" (2008)	"Audience of One" (2009)	"Savior" (2009)

"Audience of One" is a song by American punk rock band Rise Against, written by the band's frontman Tim McIlrath. It is the second single from their 2008 album Appeal to Reason. Hitting number four on the Billboard Alternative Songs chart, "Audience of One" is Rise Against's third-highest charting single, behind the previous single from Appeal to Reason, "Re-Education (Through Labor)", which peaked at number three and the third single "Savior".

== Performance ==
In mid-October 2008, the L.A. radio station KROQ began playing "Audience of One." Its video was announced to be shot with director Brett Simon on December 9. On January 15, 2009, the video for "Audience of One" premiered on MySpace. The song impacted radio on January 20. The single was released on CD and 7" vinyl on March 3, 2009, in the UK.

== Music video ==
The music video features an eight-year-old boy who resembles George W. Bush playing with a miniature world, and throughout the video the boy plays with objects depicting high gas prices, the war in Iraq, the funeral of a soldier, Abu Ghraib prison, the devastation of Hurricane Katrina, deforestation, house foreclosures, gay marriage, and illegal immigration before going to bed in the White House. It also features Rise Against performing in a miniature White House lawn, which the boy smashes before the end of the video.

== Track listing ==
No.	Title	Length
1.	"Audience of One"	4:05
2.	"Tour Song" (live Jawbreaker cover)	3:16

== Charts ==
=== Weekly charts ===
Weekly chart performance for "Audience of One"
Chart (2009)	Peak position
Canada Hot 100 (Billboard)	59
US Hot Rock & Alternative Songs (Billboard)	16

=== Year-end charts ===
Year-end chart performance for "Audience of One"
Chart (2009)	Position
US Hot Rock Songs (Billboard)	32

== See also ==
- List of anti-war songs
