= Appeal to Reason =

Appeal to Reason may refer to:

- Appeal to Reason (newspaper), US newspaper, published from 1895 until 1922
- Appeal to Reason (album), 2008 album by Rise Against
