= Savior (Rise Against song) =

Single by Rise Against

from the album Appeal to Reason
- Released: June 3, 2009
- Recorded: The Blasting Room (Fort Collins, Colorado)
- Genre: Punk rock; hard rock
- Length: 4:02
- Label: DGC; Interscope
- Songwriter: Rise Against
- Producers: Bill Stevenson; Jason Livermore

Rise Against singles chronology
"Audience of One" (2009)	"Savior" (2009)	"Help Is on the Way" (2011)

Music video
- "Savior" on YouTube

"Savior" is a song by American punk rock band Rise Against, featured on their fifth studio album Appeal to Reason (2008). In contrast to the social and political topics normally discussed in Rise Against songs, "Savior" is about forgiveness and broken relationships. It is a punk rock song, with a "frenetic pace" that John Hanson of Sputnikmusic described as reminiscent of tracks from the band's 2003 album Revolutions per Minute. It was released as Appeal to Reason's third single on June 3, 2009.

"Savior" was well received by critics, with praise for its lyrics. It remains one of the band's most commercially successful singles to date. It peaked at number three on both the Hot Rock Songs and Alternative Songs music charts, and became the record holder for the most consecutive weeks spent on the latter chart with sixty-five weeks. The accompanying music video depicts actors in animal costumes engaging in a mosh pit.

== Composition ==
"Savior"
A twenty-four second sample of the song's chorus

"Savior" is a punk rock song, and was described by Aaron Burgess of The A.V. Club as an "uptempo anthem". The song's composition is written in the time signature of common time, with a tempo of 94 beats per minute. It follows verse-chorus form, and is composed in the key F minor, with a melody that spans a tonal range of E♭_{4} to C_{6}. John Hanson of Sputnikmusic noted that the song had a "frenetic pace", which was reminiscent of many of the tracks from the band's 2003 album Revolutions per Minute.

Lyrically, "Savior" deviates from the social and political topics normally discussed in Rise Against songs, and is instead about forgiveness and broken relationships. It tells the story of a couple who have recently split up. The two attempt to reconcile their differences, with lines such as "I don't hate you, boy / I just want to save you while there's still something left to save." Critics have characterized the lyrics as "poignant", and "poetic".

Lead vocalist Tim McIlrath wrote the lyrics. While writing the lyrics for Rise Against songs, McIlrath will often sing nonsensical words over completed melodies, in order to identify the lyrical tone that each song will eventually convey. For "Savior", McIlrath remarked that while he mostly sang gibberish, he always found himself singing the line "I don't hate you". McIlrath used this line as a base to construct the lyrics and themes present within "Savior". In a 2014 interview, McIlrath commented on how he had originally voted to cut the song from Appeal to Reason, but was eventually overruled.

== Release and reception ==
"Savior" was released on June 3, 2009, as the third and final single from Rise Against's fifth album Appeal to Reason. It remains one of the band's most successful singles to date, and spent a considerable amount of time on multiple Billboard music charts. Reaching as high as number two on the Bubbling Under Hot 100 Singles chart, it spent thirty-six weeks on the chart, the fourth most time for any song on the chart. (Note: Songs that have spent more time on the Bubbling Under Hot 100 Singles chart include: Pearl Jam's "Alive" (sixty-one weeks) and "Even Flow" (fifty-two weeks), and Luther Vandross' "Think About You" (forty-three weeks).) "Savior" peaked at number three on both the Hot Rock Songs and Alternative Songs charts, and is the former record-holder for the most time spent for the Alternative Songs chart with sixty-five weeks. As of late 2023, it is ranked at number four on Billboard's list of the top 100 most successful songs in the chart's history, the highest placement for a song which did not reach number one. It also held the longevity record on the Hot Rock Songs chart with sixty-three weeks, before Awolnation's "Sail" broke the record by spending ninety-six weeks. Despite a peak at number three, "Savior" topped the year end Hot Rock charts for 2010 and was certified platinum in the United States by the Recording Industry Association of America, denoting shipments of 1,000,000 copies. In Canada, the song reached number sixty-eight on the Canadian Hot 100. It has also been certified 3× Gold in Germany by the Bundesverband Musikindustrie, Platinum in the United Kingdom by the British Phonographic Industry, and Gold in Denmark by IFPI Danmark.

"Savior" was well received by critics. Hanson and Davey Boy of Sputnikmusic both praised the song; Hanson described it as "one of the most inspired songs [Rise Against] have written to date", while Boy wrote that "'Savior' sees absolutely everything come together perfectly to make for one hell of a song". Burgess felt that "Savior" was one of three Appeal to Reason tracks that would "satisfy anyone still uneasy about Rise Against's radio aspirations". Bob Hoose of Plugged In (publication) complimented the positive and hopeful lyrics.

== Music video ==
The music video depicts actors in animal costumes engaging in a mosh pit.

The accompanying music video was directed by Kevin Kerslake, who had previously directed the band's music videos for "Ready to Fall", and "Re-Education (Through Labor)". The video centers around actors wearing animal costumes, who in the beginning, engage in a mosh pit. One of the animals, a polar bear, is constantly being punched and kicked by an elephant, and decides to leave. While traveling on a bus, it sees some of the moshers digging for food in a garbage bin, around a barrel of fire, and laying around. It then sees the same elephant limping. The polar bear reluctantly asks the driver to stop and let the elephant on, who sits next to the polar bear, and the two hold hands. Scenes of Rise Against performing and destroying their instruments are intermittently shown throughout.

McIlrath originally envisioned a simple performance video, with the band "going nuts in a parking lot, trashing equipment, having fun and showing the physical nature of Rise Against". However, Kerslake came up with the idea for the animals, as he felt it would be a bizarre element that would keep people watching. Despite its humorous nature, Kerslake stated that there were some political undertones in the video, with the polar bear representing endangered species, while the elephant represents the Republican Party of the United States. (Note: The elephant is the official symbol for the Republican Party of the United States.)

== Credits and personnel ==
Credits adapted from the liner notes of Appeal to Reason.

=== Rise Against ===
- Tim McIlrath – lead vocals, rhythm guitar
- Zach Blair – lead guitar, backing vocals
- Joe Principe – bass guitar, backing vocals
- Brandon Barnes – drums

Additional backing vocals by Chad Price

=== Production ===
- Bill Stevenson, Jason Livermore – producers
- Bill Stevenson, Jason Livermore, Andrew Berlin – audio engineering
- Chris Lord-Alge – mixing
- Ted Jensen – mastering

== Charts ==
=== Weekly charts ===
Chart (2009–10)	Peak position
Canada (Canadian Hot 100)	68
US Alternative Songs (Billboard)	3
US Bubbling Under Hot 100 Singles (Billboard)	2
US Hot Rock Songs (Billboard)	3

=== Year-end charts ===
Chart (2009)	Position
US Alternative Songs (Billboard)	13
US Hot Rock Songs (Billboard)	34

Chart (2010)	Position
US Alternative Songs (Billboard)	2
US Hot Rock Songs (Billboard)	1

=== Decade-end charts ===
Chart (2010–2019)	Position
US Hot Rock Songs (Billboard)	22

== Certifications ==
Region	Certification	Certified units/sales
Austria (IFPI Austria)	2× Platinum	60,000^{*}
Brazil (Pro-Música Brasil)	Gold	30,000^{‡}
Denmark (IFPI Danmark)	Gold	45,000^{‡}
Germany (BVMI)	3× Gold	450,000^{‡}
New Zealand (RMNZ)	2× Platinum	60,000^{‡}
United Kingdom (BPI)	Platinum	600,000^{‡}
United States (RIAA)	Platinum	1,000,000^{‡}
^{*} Sales figures based on certification alone.^{‡} Sales+streaming figures based on certification alone.
