= Re-Education (Through Labor) =

Single by Rise Against

from the album Appeal to Reason
- Released: August 25, 2008
- Recorded: The Blasting Room (Fort Collins, Colorado)
- Genre: Punk rock
- Length: 3:42
- Label: DGC; Interscope
- Songwriter: Rise Against
- Producers: Bill Stevenson; Jason Livermore

Rise Against singles chronology
"The Good Left Undone" (2007)	"Re-Education (Through Labor)" (2008)	"Audience of One" (2009)

"Re-Education (Through Labor)" is the first single from American punk rock band Rise Against's fifth studio album, Appeal to Reason. The single was released digitally to digital stores and radio stations on August 26, 2008. A music video was released on the same day.

A limited physical version of the single was released on 7" vinyl and can be obtained exclusively by pre-ordering Appeal to Reason. This version also includes a B-side titled "Minor Threat", which is a cover of the eponymous song by Minor Threat.

The single's fifth week on the Billboard Alternative Songs chart made "Re-Education (Through Labor)" Rise Against's second-highest charting single to date, hitting number five. It has since reached a peak of number three. The band's previous highest charting single on the Alternative Songs chart was "The Good Left Undone", the third single from the band's previous album, which peaked at number 6. "Re-Education (Through Labor)" is also Rise Against's first song to appear on the Hot Mainstream Rock Tracks chart.

== Recording and composition ==
"Re-Education (Through Labor)" was written Rise Against, with lyrics by lead vocalist Tim McIlrath, and produced by Bill Stevenson and Jason Livermore. Stevenson and Livermore engineered the song with Andrew Berlin, while Chris Lord-Alge assisted as the mixer. It was recorded at the Blasting Room in Fort Collins, Colorado and was mastered by Ted Jensen. Rise Against released the song as the Appeal to Reason's first single on August 25, 2008.

"Re-Education (Through Labor)" is a punk rock song that opens with a heavy metal guitar riff. John Hanson of Sputnikmusic commented that "Re-Education (Through Labor)" sounds similar to another Rise Against song, "Ready to Fall". Lyrically, it is noted for being one of more politically motivated tracks from Appeal to Reason. According to McIlrath, the lyrics are about "the 9-to-5, dog-eat-dog lifestyle, and what we are asked to do to simply make ends meet nowadays". Some music journalists have also discussed the song's meaning, with Stephen Thomas Erlewine of AllMusic writing that the lyrics "strike out against the slow dumbing down of America", while Aaron Burgess of The A.V. Club asserted that the song accuses United States President George W. Bush of fascism.

== Music video ==
Released on September 22, 2008, the song's music video was directed by Kevin Kerslake (Faith No More, Green Day), filmed in the band's home city of Chicago and features members of the Chicago branch of the Moped Army and their mopeds. The video begins with a quote from President John F. Kennedy: "Those who make peaceful revolution impossible make violent revolution inevitable." It frequently switches between scenes of the band playing in the basement of an abandoned cinema and an army of moped riders. The group drives around Chicago and drops backpacks, presumably bombs, in various locations. The closing scene shows the row of moped riders watching the city burn in the night after the bombs have detonated.

McIlrath admitted that the music video is slightly political, in a way that makes it universally relatable. He explained, "One of the great things about doing a video is that your imagination is the only thing that's limiting you, so you can do anything. So we have a video that's going to encompass the anger and the angst that the youth of America feel toward society at large and the things that are demanded of them."

There is another version of this video, with informative statistics on subjects such as deforestation, the death of children, and others. This version is called "uncensored", because the original video does not show any of this information.

== Track listing ==
No.	Title	Length
1.	"Re-Education (Through Labor)"	3:42
2.	"Minor Threat" (live Minor Threat cover)	1:40

== Charts ==
=== Weekly charts ===
Weekly chart performance for "Re-Education (Through Labor)"
Chart (2008)	Peak position
Canada Hot 100 (Billboard)	63
US Bubbling Under Hot 100 (Billboard)	12
US Alternative Airplay (Billboard)	3
US Mainstream Rock (Billboard)	22

=== Year-end charts ===
Year-end chart performance for "Re-Education (Through Labor)"
Chart (2008)	Position
US Alternative Airplay (Billboard)	34

== Certifications ==
Region	Certification	Certified units/sales
New Zealand (RMNZ)	Gold	15,000^{‡}
United States (RIAA)	Gold	500,000^{*}
^{*} Sales figures based on certification alone.^{‡} Sales+streaming figures based on certification alone.
