= Appeal to Reason (album) =

Studio album by Rise Against
- Released: October 7, 2008
- Studio: The Blasting Room (Fort Collins, Colorado)
- Genres: Melodic hardcore; punk rock
- Length: 48:23
- Labels: DGC; Interscope
- Producers: Bill Stevenson; Jason Livermore

Rise Against chronology
The Sufferer & the Witness (2006)	Appeal to Reason (2008)	Endgame (2011)

Singles from Appeal to Reason
- 1. "Re-Education (Through Labor)" Released: August 25, 2008; 2. "Audience of One" Released: January 15, 2009; 3. "Savior" Released: June 3, 2009

Appeal to Reason is the fifth studio album by American punk rock band Rise Against. It was released on October 7, 2008. It marked a musical shift to what some have viewed as a more radio-friendly sound, with greater emphasis on production and bigger, more anthemic choruses. The album's lyrics primarily focus on political issues in the United States, such as the Iraq War and the Bush administration. It is the band's first album to feature Zach Blair as guitarist, who joined the band in 2007.

Rise Against began recording Appeal to Reason in January 2008 at the Blasting Room in Fort Collins, Colorado. Producers Bill Stevenson and Jason Livermore incorporated soft tones into many of the songs to elicit a darker feel to the music. It is the band's first album with guitarist Zach Blair. Appeal to Reason debuted at number three on the Billboard 200, and was Rise Against's highest-charting album until the release of Endgame in 2011. The album sold 64,700 copies in its first week of release, and was eventually certified platinum by the Recording Industry Association of America, denoting shipments of 1,000,000 copies.

The album produced three singles: "Re-Education (Through Labor)", "Audience of One", and "Savior". All three songs charted highly on the Modern Rock Tracks chart; "Savior" in particular, held the record for the most consecutive weeks spent on both the Hot Rock Songs and Modern Rock Tracks charts, with sixty-three and sixty-five weeks respectively.

== Background and recording ==
In July 2006, Rise Against released their fourth studio album The Sufferer & the Witness, which became their first album to chart within the top ten on the Billboard 200. To promote the album, Rise Against embarked on an extensive tour that concluded at the Jingle Bell Rock festival in December 2007. That month, the band members reconvened to begin writing and demoing songs for their next album Appeal to Reason. According to bassist Joe Principe, Rise Against recorded Appeal to Reason over a two-month period starting in January 2008, which was the longest the band had ever spent on one album.

Appeal to Reason was recorded at the Blasting Room in Fort Collins, Colorado, with producers Bill Stevenson and Jason Livermore. This was the third album the duo had produced for Rise Against. Lead vocalist Tim McIlrath said: "Bill and Jason are never content to do whatever they did last month. They always want to do something different...They know us, and they know what we're capable of, they know what sounds like Rise Against, what doesn't sound like Rise Against." Livermore wanted to include soft tones to many of the songs, such as using an EBow on "Whereabouts Unknown", to elicit a darker feel to the music. For the more aggressive songs, the band members used several amplifier combinations, such as a Bogner and a Marshall Kerry King head. The band members recorded their instruments in different rooms, and the producers used overdubbing to combine the instruments into one song.

Appeal to Reason was the first Rise Against album to feature guitarist Zach Blair, who joined while the band was touring in support of The Sufferer & the Witness. According to Blair, "I wanted to go in as, If you listen to every record this band (Rise Against) had out, you could tell that Zach Blair played on this record". He took influence from how Nels Cline sounded on the album Sky Blue Sky when he joined Wilco. Blair was already well acquainted with Stevenson before joining Rise Against, as he and Stevenson were in the band Only Crime from 2003 to 2007. Stevenson helped Blair replicate the sound of past Rise Against guitarists.

== Musical style and themes ==
For Rise Against, Appeal to Reason marked a musical shift to a more accessible sound, with greater emphasis on production value. The New York Times felt the album was more tune-oriented than the band's previous works, while John Hanson of Sputnikmusic said that the album is "'appealing' to a larger audience than old fans will be comfortable with". Bill Stewart of PopMatters disagreed with these sentiments, writing: "Appeal to Reason is a Rise Against album. If you possess more than a passing familiarity with the band, I wouldn't even bother scrolling through the rest of this review, and I'd certainly avoid checking out the rating at the end of it—because that first sentence, for better or worse, says everything that needs to be said about this album." Critics have characterized the album's music as melodic hardcore, with influences of pop punk.

"Re-Education (Through Labor)"
A sample of the album's lead single, "Re-Education (Through Labor)" which shows the band's movement toward more accessible and mainstream music.

"Hero of War"
A sample of the acoustic song "Hero of War", which tells the tragedy of war on a soldier.

The majority of the album's lyrics discuss political issues in the United States. Jeff Miers of The Buffalo News calls the album "a response to the oppressive vacuousness of the Bush years". In regards to specific tracks on the album, AllMusic states that Rise Against "rages against the moral decay rotting the core of the U.S. on the opening 'Collapse (Post-Amerika),' just as they strike out against the slow dumbing down of America on 'Re-Education (Through Labor)'". In addition to political topics, more personal issues constitute a large portion of the lyrical content. "Savior" is about forgiveness and broken relationships, while "The Dirt Whispered" is about the need to sacrifice for what a person loves. Bassist Joe Principe said, "The political side of this band is just that -- it's a side. There are political lyrics. There are social awareness and there are lyrics about the environment. I think if people take the time to read the lyrics, they'll know we're not strictly force feeding you our politics."

The album includes one acoustic song, "Hero of War", which is about an Iraq War Veteran looking back on his war experiences. It is described by Rolling Stone as an "ambivalent aggro-folk track". McIlrath said of the song, "I wanted to take the perspective of 'What is the war going to be looked back on as?'" In another interview McIlrath stated, "It was a way to document what's going on, like other artists documented for their generation and for generations to come." He went on to say, "There are not many songs...talking about what's going on during eight years of occupation in Iraq. That, combined with meeting active soldiers and retired soldiers at our shows and hearing those stories about what is going on on the ground amid all the bullshit, showed me the differences from what is really happening to what is happening in the news media. I just thought that this needed to go into a song."

== Release ==
Appeal to Reason was released on October 7, 2008. It was the first Rise Against album to be released by Interscope Records. In the United States, the album peaked at number three on the Billboard 200, making it Rise Against's highest-charting album at the time. The album sold 64,000 copies in its first week of release, and by December 2010, it had sold 482,000 copies. It was certified platinum by the Recording Industry Association of America in July 2021, denoting shipments of 1,000,000 copies in the United States. When asked about the commercial success of Appeal to Reason, drummer Brandon Barnes said "It was surprising to us. We are very proud of the CD and happy with how it turned out, but going to No. 3 was big for us."

Appeal to Reason was also a commercial success internationally. In Canada, the album reached number one on the Canadian Albums Chart, Rise Against's first album to do so. It was certified double platinum by Music Canada, denoting shipments of 200,000 copies. The album peaked at number seven on the ARIA Top 100 Albums Chart in Australia, and number twenty-one on the Top 100 Albums chart in Germany and was certified platinum. It was certified gold in Australia and New Zealand, denoting shipments of 35,000 and 7,500 copies respectively. The album peaked in several other countries, including number thirty-four in Austria and was certified platinum, number fifty-five in Belgium, number thirty-four in New Zealand, number fifty-one in Sweden, number forty-four in Switzerland, and number sixty-eight in the United Kingdom, where it was certified silver by the BPI.

Three songs from Appeal to Reason were released as singles: "Re-Education (Through Labor)", "Audience of One", and "Savior". All three singles charted on the Modern Rock Tracks chart, peaking at number three, four, and three respectively. "Savior" in particular, held the record for the most consecutive weeks spent on both the Hot Rock Songs and Modern Rock Tracks charts, with sixty-three and sixty-five weeks respectively. (Note: "Sail" by Awolnation has since broken the longevity record on the Hot Rock Songs chart, where it spent ninety-six weeks.)

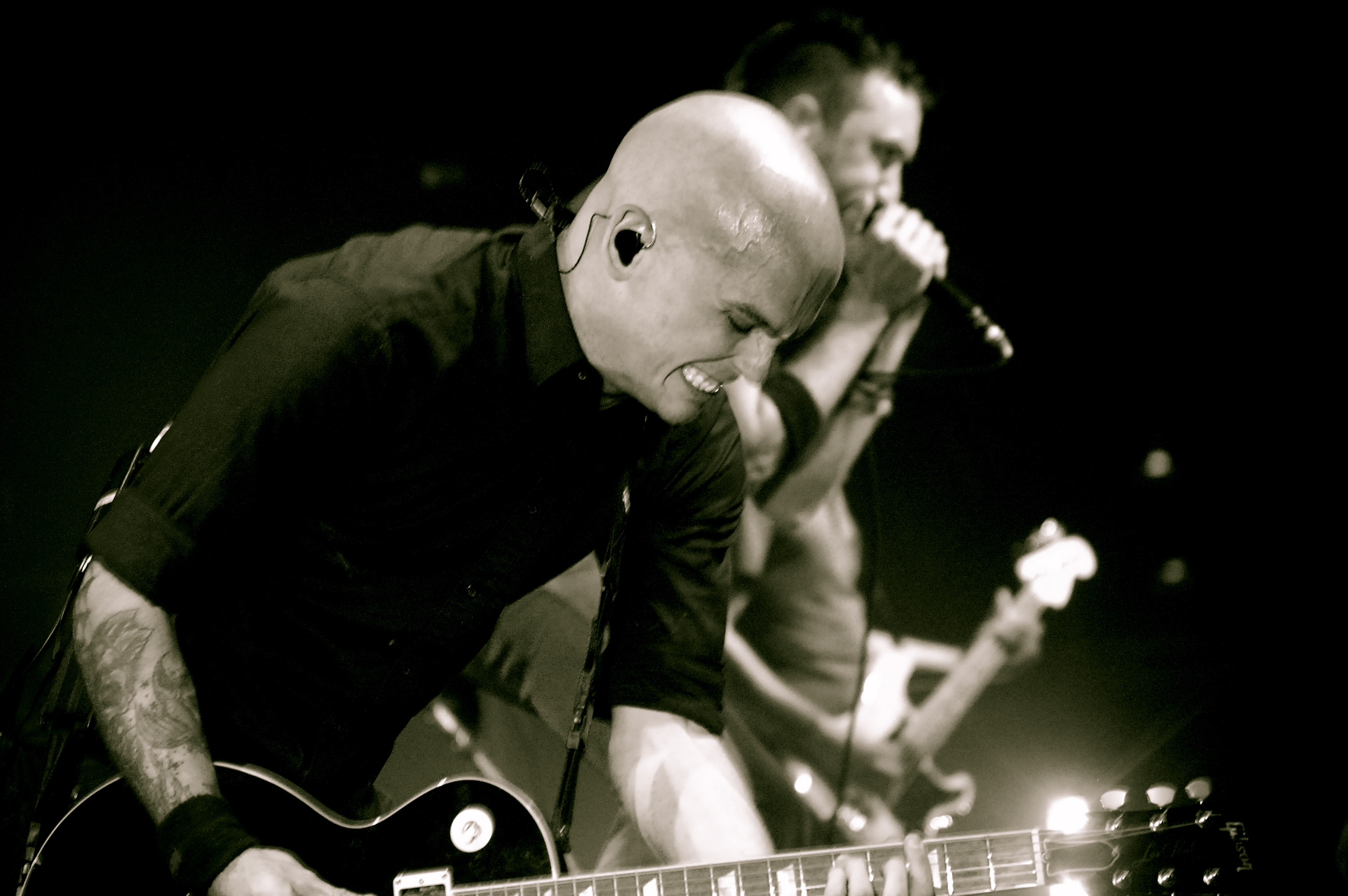
Guitarist Zach Blair and vocalist Tim McIlrath (right) playing on the Appeal to Reason tour on October 11, 2008.

Accompanying music videos were shot for all three songs. The video for "Re-Education (Through Labor)" features the Chicago sect of the Moped Army planting and detonating bombs throughout the city. The video garnered controversy, as some viewers saw this as an act of condoning terrorism. In the "Audience of One" video, the members of Rise Against perform on a miniaturized version of the White House lawn, while a child plays with the small figurines. The video deals with various themes, including gay marriage and militarization. The video for "Savior" features actors in animal costumes engaging in a mosh pit. Rise Against also produced a video for "Hero of War" despite it not being a single. The video follows the song's lyric thread, and features a soldier looking back on his traumatic war experiences.

To promote the album, Rise Against embarked on the Appeal to Reason tour, which began with United States-based tour with Thrice, Alkaline Trio, and the Gaslight Anthem. Rise Against then co-headlined a 2009 tour with Rancid throughout the summer months, which was followed by a short tour of the United Kingdom in November, supported by the bands Thursday and Poison the Well. Some of the 2009 performances were recorded and compiled in the 2010 DVD Another Station: Another Mile. These performances were interspersed with interviews of the band members about the process of recording an album.

== Critical reception ==
Professional ratings
Aggregate scores
Source	Rating
Metacritic	65/100
Review scores
Source	Rating
AllMusic	3/5 stars
AbsolutePunk	82%
The A.V. Club	B
Entertainment Weekly	C+
PopMatters	5/10
Rolling Stone	3.5/5 stars
Sputnikmusic	3.5/5

Appeal to Reason received a score of 65 out of 100 on Metacritic's average of ten professional reviews, indicating "generally favorable reviews". One of the more positive reviews was by Chris Fallon of AbsolutePunk, who said: "Appeal to Reason is essentially focused on one big thing: intelligence. There is no fluff here -- the band has put together a fast, smart and generally focused piece of work here." Rolling Stone magazine commented on the band's further emergence into the mainstream with Appeal to Reason, and wrote "Rise Against may be nervous about leaving the underground behind, but with sharp songs like these, they're ready for the rest of the world." The A.V. Club's Aaron Burgess agreed with this statement, and wrote that uptempo tracks such as "Savior", "Kotov Syndrome", and "Entertainment" would convince long time fans that Rise Against had not sold out.

Appeal to Reason also had less positive reception, with most negative reviews criticizing the band's further movement into the mainstream. Entertainment Weekly commented: "Songs like 'Re-Education (Through Labor)' and 'Entertainment,' which seeks to redress the evils of media manipulation upon the land, are peppy but pretty empty, power-chord downers with little bark or bite." PopMatters said "McIlrath rarely reaches beyond his one-note vocal performance despite apparent and commendable earnestness". The review further chastised Blair's formulaic three-chord guitar playing through the album. While reviewing Rise Against's next album, Endgame, Alternative Press critic Scott Heisel wrote: "Sure, it may have sold half a million copies, but Rise Against's Appeal To Reason was, in our humble opinion, a dud. The album was a slow, lumbering affair that seemingly betrayed the band's natural melodic-hardcore predilections for a stronger chance at appealing to the Rock on the Range crowd."

== Track listing ==
All lyrics written by Tim McIlrath; all music composed by Rise Against.

No.	Title	Length
1.	"Collapse (Post-Amerika)"	3:19
2.	"Long Forgotten Sons"	4:01
3.	"Re-Education (Through Labor)"	3:42
4.	"The Dirt Whispered"	3:09
5.	"Kotov Syndrome"	3:05
6.	"From Heads Unworthy"	3:42
7.	"The Strength to Go On"	3:27
8.	"Audience of One"	4:05
9.	"Entertainment"	3:34
10.	"Hero of War"	4:13
11.	"Savior"	4:02
12.	"Hairline Fracture"	4:02
13.	"Whereabouts Unknown"	4:02
Total length:		48:23

Appeal to Reason – Australian edition
No.	Title	Length
14.	"Historia Calamitatum"	3:23
Total length:		51:46

Appeal to Reason – Japanese edition
No.	Title	Length
15.	"Sight Unseen"	3:56
Total length:		52:19

Appeal to Reason – iTunes edition
No.	Title	Length
16.	"Elective Amnesia"	3:54
Total length:		52:17

== Personnel ==
Credits adapted from the liner notes of Appeal to Reason.

Rise Against

- Tim McIlrath – lead vocals and rhythm electric guitar
- Joe Principe – electric bass guitar and backing vocals
- Zach Blair – lead electric guitar and backing vocals
- Brandon Barnes – drum kit

Additional musicians

- Matt Skiba – guest vocals on "Hairline Fracture"
- Chad Price – backing vocals

Production

- Bill Stevenson – producer, engineer
- Jason Livermore – producer, engineer
- Andrew Berlin – engineer, additional production
- Evan Peters – A&R coordinator
- Felipe Patino – additional engineering
- Lee Miles – additional engineering
- Chris Lord-Alge – mixer
- Keith Armstrong – assistant mixer
- Nik Karen – assistant mixer
- Brad Townsend – additional engineering
- Ted Jensen – mastering
- Cliff Feiman – production manager

== Charts ==
=== Weekly charts ===
Weekly chart performance for Appeal to Reason
Chart (2008)	Peak position
Australian Albums (ARIA)	7
Austrian Albums (Ö3 Austria)	34
Belgian Albums (Ultratop Flanders)	55
Canadian Albums (Billboard)	1
German Albums (Offizielle Top 100)	21
New Zealand Albums (RMNZ)	34
Scottish Albums (Official Charts)	61
Swedish Albums (Sverigetopplistan)	51
Swiss Albums (Schweizer Hitparade)	44
UK Albums (Official Charts)	68
US Billboard 200	3
US Top Rock Albums (Billboard)	2

=== Year-end charts ===
Year-end chart performance for Appeal to Reason
Chart (2009)	Position
US Billboard 200	145

== Certifications ==
Certifications and sales for Appeal to Reason
Region	Certification	Certified units/sales
Australia (ARIA)	Gold	35,000^{^}
Austria (IFPI Austria)	Platinum	20,000^{*}
Canada (Music Canada)	2× Platinum	160,000^{^}
Germany (BVMI)	Platinum	200,000^{‡}
New Zealand (RMNZ)	Gold	7,500^{‡}
United Kingdom (BPI)	Silver	60,000^{‡}
United States (RIAA)	Platinum	1,000,000^{‡}
^{*} Sales figures based on certification alone.^{^} Shipments figures based on certification alone.^{‡} Sales+streaming figures based on certification alone.
