= The Romance of Helen Trent (album) =

Studio album by The Killing Tree
- Released: June 25, 2002
- Recorded: December 2001 – January 2002
- Studio: Atlas Studios, Chicago, IL
- Genre: Metalcore; hardcore punk; post-hardcore
- Length: 52:15
- Label: One Day Savior
- Producer: Matt Allison

The Killing Tree chronology
Bury Me At Make-Out Creek (2000)	The Romance of Helen Trent (2002)	We Sing Sin (2003)

The Romance of Helen Trent is the only studio album from the metalcore band The Killing Tree. It was first released in limited editions on June 22, 2002 during an album release show before being formally released by One Day Savior Recordings on June 25, 2002. The album was recorded by Matt Allison at Atlas Studios, Chicago, Illinois over the course of one week.

== Recording ==
Looking back on the recording process, Geoff Rue said that "after a demo ep (Bury Me At Make-Out Creek), we re-entered the old Atlas Studios, which has since become a Korean taco place, and recorded the LP in just over a weeks time, all in evening and late night sessions since the studio shared walls with a few businesses, so we couldn't really get going until they closed for the day. Matt Allison was good natured about our manic pace to pound out the record as fast as possible (we couldn't afford much studio time), yet also patient when we insisted on numerous layers of the clap track that begins 'The Perfect'."

== Copyright issues ==
A contract was never signed between the record company and the band, so it is unknown who legally possesses the copyrights of The Romance of Helen Trent; which is thought to be the main reason behind the album's lack of a reissue.

However, despite not being currently available on streaming services or on CD, the album has seen a limited edition rerelease on vinyl for the first time on November 23, 2018 via Think Fast! Records.

== Helena Marie ==
Multiple songs on the album feature intros consisting of a woman speaking about recent things she has been through. The samples are from an audio diary found in a garbage bag of a girl known only as "Helena Marie". Tim McIlrath has said of the tapes "None of us expected the messages in Helena Marie's audio diary to parallel The Killing Tree message so closely. And when it did, we knew it was just meant to be. It still gives me chills sometimes."

In August 2018, Reu stated in the liner notes for vinyl reissue of the album, "Tim's roommate at the time, the brilliance and enigmatic Davy Rothbart, who was starting up Found Magazine, had given us a tape of recorded diary-style therapeutic confessions that he had found during his scavenging for abandoned personal artifacts. The voice on the tape identified herself as Helena Murray, and she was at turns vulnerable, self-hating, naïve, regretful, optimistic, emotionally raw, and crushingly honest about her life, relationships, and the inner world. We connected with her voice immediately - she was a kindred spirit - and it felt like it was the spoken word companion to everything we were trying to channel into the songs we had written for the record both thematically and musically, so we wove a few excerpts from the tape throughout the record and name the project after an old radio soap opera, which was similar in name and the protagonist's brave honesty in searching for love and self in the face of the crushing disappointment life has to offer."

== Limited edition ==
A limited-edition version of the album was planned to be sold at the Fireside Bowl, Chicago, at the album release show on June 22, 2002. Due to problems during the pressing of the album, The Killing Tree had to 'pool their resources' in order to make 100 copies available at the show. These 100 limited copies were sold out at the release show. The 200 delayed copies soon arrived, and featured the same album artwork, but a slightly different insert and disk design as the previous limited edition CD. These editions of the album were mastered by Alan Douches. These copies were sold at live shows exclusively with standard edition being released on June 25, 2002.

== Reception ==
Professional ratings
Review scores
Source	Rating
AllMusic	4.5/5 stars
Aversion Online	6/10 stars
Punk News	5/5 stars
Sputnikmusic	4.5/5 stars

AllMusic gave the album 4.5 stars out of 5. Aversion Online gave the album 6 out of 10 stars.

== Track listing ==
No.	Title	Length
1.	"Prelude to Pain"	5:59
2.	"Them's Fightin' Words"	4:46
3.	"Switchblade Architect"	5:09
4.	"Replace My Heart"	6:58
5.	"Soundtrack to a Failing Relationship" (Instrumental)	4:51
6.	"Violets Are Blue"	6:18
7.	"The Perfect"	6:10
8.	"Counting to Infinity"	5:06
9.	"Cacophony (The Death of Affection)"	6:58
Total length:		52:15

== Personnel ==
- James Kaspar – lead vocals, rhythm guitar
- Todd Rundgren – lead guitar
- Jean-Luc Rue – bass, backing vocals
- Botchy Vasquez – drums
