= Tower of Rome =

US musical group

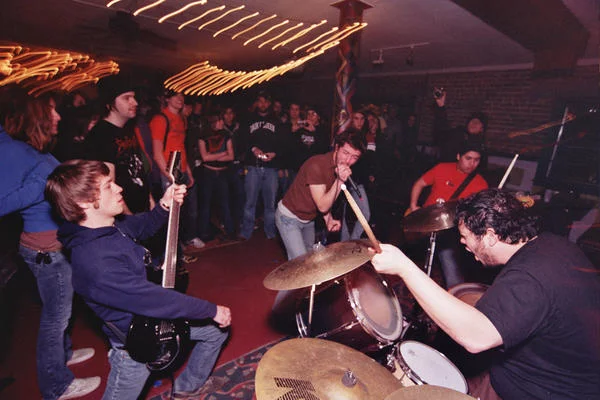
- Tower of Rome performing live

Background information
- Origin: South Holland, Illinois
- Genre: Mathgrind • grindcore • mathcore
- Years active: 2002–2006, 2007
- Labels: Hewhocorrupts, inc, Sonic Deadline
- Past members: Joshua Snader; Tony Marzilli; Mike Serrano; Aaron Guitierrez

Tower Of Rome was a mathgrind band from South Holland, Illinois, that first formed in 2002. After releasing a demo through the music sharing website HardcoreMP3.com, the band were signed onto Hewhocorrupts' label in June 2004 after meeting the group at a live show, who released their two albums All Is Lost...All Is Lost...All Is Yet To Be Found (November 16, 2004) and World War 1 (June 6, 2006). The group toured with Stand Before the Firing Squad across the United States in 2005, and they have also performed with acts such as Melt-Banana and Daughters. The group intended to tour Europe in the summer of 2006, however it was cancelled due to van failure.

The group announced a hiatus in late 2006, citing reasons such as equipment destroyed in a flood, van failure, and multiple cancelled shows. The band would eventually reunite in 2007, even performing at Dude Fest 2007. The band has been, however, inactive since. Members have since gone on to bands such as Sorespot, CSTVT, and Sea Of Shit.

== Members ==
- Joshua Snader – vocals
- Tony Marzilli – guitar
- Mike Serrano – bass
- Aaron Guitierrez – drums

== Discography ==
Studio albums

- All Is Lost...All Is Lost...All Is Yet To Be Found (2004, Hewhocorrupts, inc)
- World War 1 (2006, Hewhocorrupts, inc)

Splits

- Tower Of Rome/Gun Kata (2005, Sonic Deadline)

Demos

- Tower Of Rome (2003, self-released)

Compilations

- Discography (2019, Wax Vessel)
