= Where Sleeplessness Is Rest from Nightmares =

Where Sleeplessness Is Rest From Nightmares

Studio album by Arma Angelus
- Released: December 4, 2001
- Recorded: September 7–14, 2001
- Studio: Zing Studios in Westfield, Massachusetts
- Genre: Metalcore; mathcore
- Length: 35:49
- Label: Eulogy
- Producer: Adam Dutkiewicz; Arma Angelus

Arma Angelus chronology
The Grave End of the Shovel EP (2000)	Where Sleeplessness Is Rest From Nightmares (2001)

Professional ratings
Review scores
Source	Rating
Lambgoat	6/10

Where Sleeplessness Is Rest from Nightmares is the only studio album by the Chicago metalcore band Arma Angelus. It was released December 4, 2001, through Eulogy Recordings.

== Track listing ==
All lyrics are written by Pete Wentz; all music is composed by Arma Angelus. "Surrender" written by Rick Nielsen.

No.	Title	Length
1.	"An Anthem for Those Without Breath and Heart"	1:22
2.	"We Are the Pale Horse"	4:18
3.	"For the Expatriates of Human Civilization"	3:55
4.	"To Feel No More Bitterness Forever"	4:40
5.	"Misanthrope" (labelled as "Misanthrope 2.0" in the layout/insert)	4:33
6.	"Cold Pillows and Warm Blades"	5:17
7.	"I'm Every Broken Man"	11:44
Total length:		35:49

- "I'm Every Broken Man" ends at 6:13. After a minute and five seconds of silence (6:18 - 7:23), a hidden track, a cover of "Surrender" by Cheap Trick, begins.

== Personnel ==
Adapted from AllMusic:

Arma Angelus

- Pete Wentz – lead vocals
- Jay Jancetic – lead guitar
- Adam Bishop – rhythm guitar
- Dan Binaei – rhythm guitar
- Chris Gutierrez – bass guitar, backing vocals
- Timothy Miller – drums

Additional

- Produced and engineered by Adam Dutkiewicz and Arma Angelus
- Karl Hlavinka – symbols and image controller
- Joel Dowling – photography
- John McKaig – photography
- Seth Lingebrigtson – "How to be a Strangler"/"Dangerous" photography
- Guav – design, logotype
