= KungFu Rick =

KungFu Rick was formed in 1996 with founding members John Mendola (guitar), Bryan Margner (vocals), Ryan Durkin (vocals), John Biehl (drums), and Eric Kline (bass), who attended high school together in Elmhurst, Illinois, a suburb of Chicago. The name was created by Mendola during high school after brainstorming names and thought of "Kung Fu Grip", which later turned into a more randomized version of KungFu Rick. It was intentionally misspelled and remained that way for the majority of the band's releases. The band was a vital part of the local DuPage County Music Scene, one that the successful bands, Rise Against and The Plain White T's, emerged from.

== Background ==
The musical style started out as more of a joke - to play fast and crazy music, with ridiculous lyrics. It was only later that the band evolved into the scene in which it would be more associated with, grindcore / powerviolence, and thrash punk. The band's first show was April 4, 1996. The band has been credited by John Hoffman (vocalist) with inspiring his successful power violence band, Weekend Nachos as noted in the documentary No Delusions. The band later spawned HeWhoCorrupts.

In 1998, the band was approached by fellow local area musicians, Jon Finaldi and Jason Zdora, of the band, Suburban Refugee. The two ended up joining the band, with Finaldi on drums and Zdora as the second guitarist. Kline later left the band within the next 6months, being replaced by David Rudnik of Seven Days of Samsara (later Get Rad), from Milwaukee, Wisconsin.

The band toured in 1998 with fellow Chicago band, My Lai (which at the time featured members of the band 7,000 Dying Rats, and later members of Cattle Decapitation, Phobia, as well as several others). Most of the tour consisted of west coast and parts of the south. During the California portion of the tour, the band played with The Locust and Cattle Decapitation, at one point playing a show in and staying at, the home of Justin Pearson of The Locust.

In 1999–2000, the band toured the East Coast, and consistently played around the Midwest.

On January 31, 2003, the band played the infamous 924 Gilman Street Club in Berkeley, California.

Over the years, the band has played with such notable acts as Melt Banana, Yakuza, and Life's Halt. It has released records on 625 Thrashcore and several other underground indie labels. Three members went on to be in HeWhoCorrupts.

== Band members ==
Final Lineup

- Ryan Durkin – vocals
- Bryan Margner - vocals
- John Mendola – guitar
- Jason Zdora – guitar
- David Rudnik – bass
- Jon Finaldi - Drums

Original / Past Members

- Eric Kline - Bass
- John Biehl - Drums
