= The Killing Tree =

American hardcore punk band

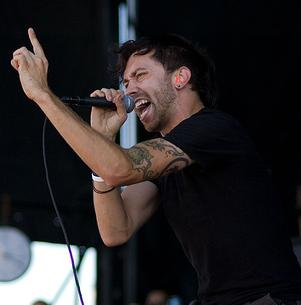
- McIlrath performing in 2006.

Background information
- Origin: Chicago, Illinois, United States
- Genres: Metalcore; hardcore punk; post-hardcore
- Years active: 1999–2006
- Labels: Eyeball; One Day Savior; Government Music
- Spinoff of: Rise Against; Baxter
- Members: Tim McIlrath; Todd Mohney; Geoff Reu; Timothy Remis
- Past members: Laura Cahill; Neil Hennessy
- Website: www.thekillingtree.com

The Killing Tree (sometimes abbreviated as TKT) were a hardcore punk band from Chicago, Illinois. They were a side project of Tim McIlrath during the early days of Rise Against and featured former Rise Against guitarist Todd Mohney and bassist Geoff Reu of Baxter and Holy Roman Empire.

== Career ==
The Killing Tree was formed shortly after Tim McIlrath's other band, Rise Against, in 1999. The band's main line-up consisted of McIlrath on guitar and vocals, Reu on bass and backing vocals, Mohney on guitar, and Remis on drums.

In an interview, Tim McIlrath told the interviewer "I used to play in a band called Baxter with Geoff Reu and Remis, and we always had an itch to do heavier music. After Baxter broke up we would have sporadic, impromptu jam sessions in my basement for a year, with no real intention of starting anything. We actually had a female roommate at the time singing for us for a while! Either way, the songs began to take shape and we realized we needed someone else to complete the chaos, so we enlisted Todd to shred with us, and all the pieces fell into place. After we completed a number of songs we realized that what started out as fun we thought might actually go over well. "

McIlrath was concerned that Rise Against's record label, Fat Wreck Chords would not want him recording with a different band, so all members of The Killing Tree used false identities when performing and recording. In February 2003, the band signed to Eyeball Records, who released the band's We Sing Sin EP in May 2003.

In an Interview with Punknews.org Tim McIlrath was asked about The Killing Tree's future and said: "I would love to. I would love to right now. I'd love to call those guys and just fucking write a record right now if we could. I think Neil is getting back from Europe today and I'm going to hang out with him later tonight. Todd is out of LA right now doing a bunch of graphic design stuff and Geoff is doing Holy Roman and also doing his masters degree at UIC. For me and Neil to actually have lunch together though, that's like the stars are aligned. It's a fucking miracle. I would love to and I think that I still love the Killing Tree and what we've created. I love the record, it was a lot of fun. But, there's no real mystery to why we're not doing records- it's simply because there's no time. If there was, we'd all be having a lot of fun and writing some new songs or at least playing some shows. But who knows, we tend to do a show every year or so in Chicago somewhere.."

Despite this claim, the Killing Tree has not performed live since 2004 or released any new music since 2006.

== Musical style ==
The Killing Tree's musical style is typified by longer songs and more prominent metalcore and Swedish death metal influences, such as screaming vocals and aggressive breakdowns, than that of McIlrath's other band, Rise Against. Although the vocals are primarily screamed, many tracks alternate between screaming and clean vocals. The lyrics tend to be darker and have violent themes. They have been described as metalcore, hardcore punk and post-hardcore, with their style having been compared to acts such as AFI, At the Drive-In and Sparta.

== Discography ==
Studio albums

- The Romance of Helen Trent (2002)

EPs

- Bury Me at Make-Out Creek (2000)
- We Sing Sin (2003)

Compilations

- Hair: Chicago Punk Cuts ("Dressed to Fuck" only) (2006)

== Members ==
- Tim McIlrath (James Kaspar) - lead vocals, rhythm guitar (1999-2006)
- Todd Mohney (Todd Rundgren) - lead guitar (1999-2006)
- Geoff Reu (Jean-Luc Rue) - bass, backing vocals (1999-2006)
- Timothy Remis (Botchy Vasquez) - drums (2000-2006)

Previous members

- Laura Cahill - co-lead vocals (1999)
- Neil Hennessy - drums (1999)

== Other appearances ==
- Emily Schambra (of Holy Roman Empire) - guest vocals on "Dressed To Fuck"
