= Baxter (punk band) =

American band

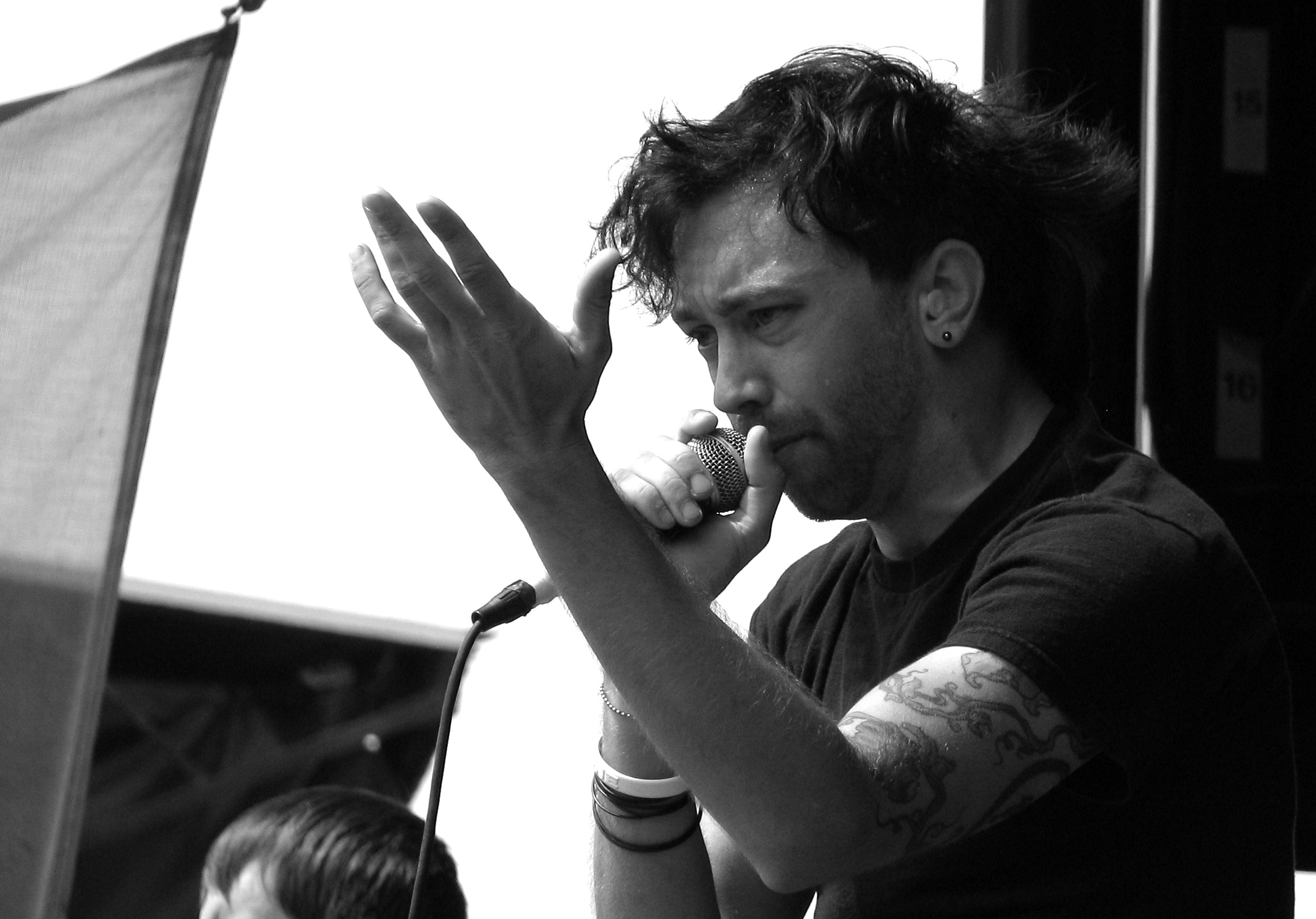
- McIlrath performing in 2006.

Background information
- Origin: Chicago, Illinois, United States
- Genres: Post-hardcore, art punk
- Years active: 1995–1999
- Labels: Static Station Records; Will Not Clear Man
- Members: Tim McIlrath; Neil Hennessy; Timothy Remis; J. Wood; Anthony Fiore

Baxter (sometimes typeset .baxter.) was an American, Chicago-based post-hardcore band. The band consisted of Tim McIlrath (later of Rise Against and The Killing Tree), Neil Hennessy (later of The Lawrence Arms, The Killing Tree, The Falcon and Colossal), Anthony Fiore, later replaced by Timothy Remis (later of The Killing Tree, Sweet Cobra, Hill Dunes, Cloakroom), and a bassist only referred to as J. Wood.

== Biography ==
Baxter formed in 1995 in Chicago, Illinois and began playing basement shows and building up a fanbase. They first recorded a self-titled EP that featured a female fighter in the cover that resembles Chun-Li from the Street Fighter series. Their first record was released independently in 1997 as a full-length cassette entitled Troy's Bucket, and enjoyed moderate success in the underground scene. Later that year, it was also re-released under Astroboy Records. They began touring extensively around the Midwest. In 1997, they signed to the independent label Static Station.

1997 also saw the release of a 7-inch entitled Lost Voices, and by this time they were very popular in the local scene. In 1999 they split up and members have remained active in the hardcore scene in bands such as The Killing Tree, The Honor System, The Lawrence Arms, and most notably, Rise Against. In 2003, Will Not Clear Man records put out .baxter., a compilation of both of their official releases as well as several unreleased songs and demos. It was mastered Doug Ward. In 2004, Minneapolis rapper P.O.S sampled the track "Out of Reach" for his track "Kidney Thief" off the album Ipecac Neat.

The song "Survivor's Guilt" by Rise Against uses the same sample from the movie Catch-22 that can be heard in the song "Burden" on Troy's Bucket.

== Discography ==
- Baxter (1996) - Self-released
- Troy's Bucket (1997) - Astroboy Records (Early editions were Self-released)
- Lost Voices... (1997) - Static Station Records
- Eastman & Evergreen (1999) - Science Records
- .baxter. (2003) - Will Not Clear Man records

== Members ==
=== Final lineup ===
- Tim McIlrath - lead vocals (1995-1999)
- Neil Hennessy - guitar, backing vocals (1995-1999)
- Timothy Remis - drums (1997-1999)
- J.Wood - bass guitar (1995-1999)

=== Former members ===
- Anthony Fiore - drums (1995-1997)
