= Arma Angelus =

American metalcore band (1998–2002)

- Also known as: Novena
- Origin: Chicago, Illinois, U.S.
- Genres: Metalcore; hardcore punk
- Years active: 1998–2002
- Labels: Eulogy, Let It Burn
- Spinoffs: Fall Out Boy, Rise Against
- Past members: Pete Wentz; Jay Jancetic; Adam Bishop; Daniel Binaei; Andy Hurley; Timothy Miller; Christopher Gutierrez; Patrick Stump; Joe Trohman; Tim McIlrath

Arma Angelus (formerly known as Novena) was a metalcore band from Chicago, Illinois. The band was formed in 1998 and disbanded in 2002. Members of the band were Pete Wentz (vocals, now bass guitarist and backing vocalist in Fall Out Boy), Tim McIlrath (bass guitar, now lead singer and rhythm guitarist of Rise Against), Jay Jancetic (guitar, last played guitar for Chicago bands Holy Roman Empire and Harm's Way), Daniel Binaei (guitarist, formerly of Racetraitor), Adam Bishop (guitarist, now an English teacher at San Dieguito Academy High School in Encinitas, California) and Timothy Miller (drums, last played drums for Arizona punk band Last Action Zeros and now owns Immortal Art Tattoo & Body Piercing in Scottsdale, Arizona).

== History ==
After McIlrath left to form Rise Against, he was replaced in 1999 by Christopher Gutierrez. Gutierrez was a touring author and spoken word artist and founded and runs The Catcade in Chicago. Gutierrez was replaced as bass guitarist for one tour by Joe Trohman (also a guitarist in Fall Out Boy and in The Damned Things). He was replaced mid-tour when the band flew Chris Gutierrez out to New York for the final half of their tour, including a stop at CBGB's. In the last Arma Angelus concert, (which also had Fall Out Boy billed) Patrick Stump played drums, Pete Wentz sang and Trohman played guitar, along with Adam Bishop, and Christopher Gutierrez on bass guitar.

== Musical style ==
AllMusic described the band's style as "dark and metallic hardcore". Heather Weil of Verbicide Magazine stated the band "is one of the handful of metal-influenced hardcore bands that actually know what they’re doing, and how to pull it off". Under the Gun reviews described their sound as "Sending out posi vibes to kids fighting in the crowd during the band’s last set, Pete screams his sober heart out while Joe Trohman filled in on guitar and Patrick Stump took role of drummer". In reference to their sole studio album, TeethOfTheDevine.com said that "Where most bands in this space use death and thrash metal devices to create a sense of heaviness missing in traditional hardcore, Arma Angelus’ thick, angular attack comes from a rock and roll sense of composition that's every bit as heavy as their metal-infused counterparts. True, elements of Where Sleeplessness is Rest from Nightmares do delve into death metal territory (vocals, tuning), the majority of Arma Angelus’ material pummels to the tune of catchy, head-bashing song structure." Upon their disbandment, the members stated that "the goal of Arma Angelus was to express and stimulate discourse within the punk and hardcore community and to express our distaste for apathy and uncaring, which we felt had become ideals with in the community"

They have cited Damnation A.D. as their biggest influence.

== Band members ==
Final lineup

- Pete Wentz – lead vocals (1998–2002)
- Joe Trohman – lead guitar (2002)
- Christopher Gutierrez – bass, backing vocals (2000–2002)
- Adam Bishop – rhythm guitar (2000–2002), lead guitar (1998–2000, 2000–2002)
- Patrick Stump – drums (2002)

Former members

- Daniel Binaei – rhythm guitar (1998–2002)
- Tim McIlrath – bass, clean vocals (1998–2000)
- Jay Jancetic – lead guitar (2000–2002)
- Timothy Miller – drums (1998–2002)

== Discography ==
Studio albums

- Where Sleeplessness Is Rest from Nightmares (2001, Eulogy Recordings)

Extended plays

- The Personal Is Political (Demo) (2000)
- The Grave End of the Shovel EP (2000, Let It Burn Records/Happy Couples Never Last Records)
- Arma Angelus & Until The End (2001, Eulogy Recordings)

Guest appearances

- Eulogy Recordings / One Day Savior Recordings Sampler (2001, One Day Savior/Eulogy Recordings)
- Redline Distribution Volume 1 Fall 2001 (2001, Redline Distribution)
- Ascend From The Darkness (2001, Dark Vision Records)
- Chicago Arise From The Ashes (2001, Sinister Label)
- Things We Don't Like We Destroy: Let It Burn Sampler (2002, Let It Burn Records)
- Covered In Blood (2002, Spook City Records)
- Transcend: Eulogy + Alveran (2003, Alveran Records/Eulogy Recordings)
- Ya Basta! A Benefit for Food for Chiapas (Powderkerg Records)
- Shit We Don't Like We Destroy (Join The Team Player Records/Let It Burn Records)
