= Hewhocorrupts =

Chicago-based grindcore band

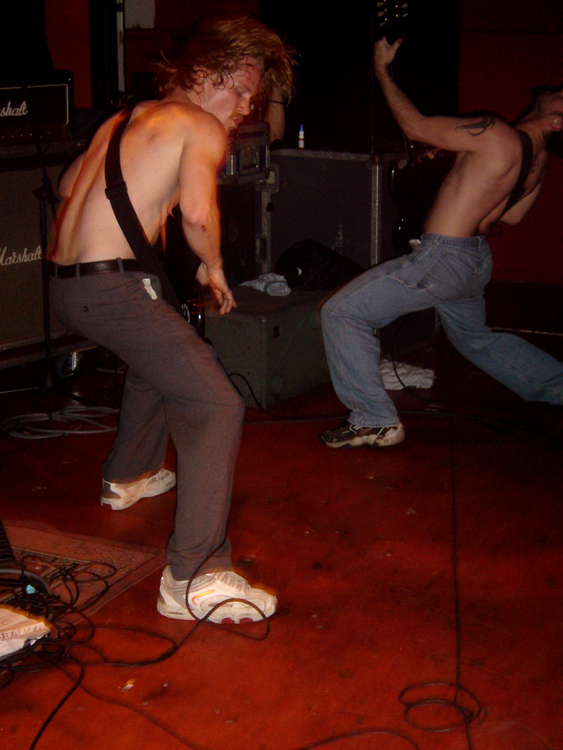
- Hewhocorrupts (2005)

Background information
- Origin: Chicago, United States
- Genres: Hardcore punk, grindcore
- Labels: Hewhocorrupts, Inc.
- Members: Tommy Camaro (Ryan Durkin); Cory Lockheart; Rory Lockheart; Caz U.L. Friday; Maxwell Brotherhood Shredmoore; Ross Boneyard
- Past members: Mike Costello (vocals - Optimus Prime); Theo Katsaounis (bass - Optimus Prime)

Hewhocorrupts is a Chicago-based grindcore band that uses corporate lingo and aesthetics. They are most known for their songs mocking Metallica, making reference to the notorious allegations of the group having sold out by parodying the band's song titles with their own business-related counterparts: Ride the Lightning is retitled Ride the Limo and Master of Puppets becomes Master of Profits. This jab of satire is carried through the entire band's style. Their own site refers to them as "Hewhocorrupts Megacorp.", and they appear in a costume of business suits and aviator sunglasses informally known as "hardcorporate", in reference to other styles such as hardcore, grindcore, etc.

Members of the band were in the power violence/grindcore band Kungfu Rick and in Authority Abuse. The band's Tommy Camaro (Ryan Durkin) – along with Andy Slania – operates an indie record label, Hewhocorrupts, Inc., which has released records by such artists as 7000 Dying Rats, Holy Roman Empire, Russian Circles, Tower of Rome, and Tusk.

== Discography ==
=== Studio albums ===
- Ten Steps To Success CD (2003, Sinister Label)
- Ten Steps To Success LP (2003, 625 Trashcore / Forge Again Records)
- The Discographer CD/2xLP (2004, Forge Again Records, Level Plane Records, Scenester Credentials, Init records, Slave Union and Underground Communique Records)
- Der EU-Investitionsantrag 12" (2005, Bloom Explode)
- Golden Parachute LP (2022, Forge Again Records)

=== Singles / Splits / EPs ===
- Split-CD with Wilbur Cobb 7" (2000, Vendetta Records)
- Split-CD with Tusk 7" (2001, Hewhocorrupts Inc.)
- Split-CD with Godstomper CD / 7" (2001, Blind Date Records)
- Split-CD with Third Degree 7" (2002, Selfmadegod Records)
- Split-CD with Infestation of Ass 7" (2002, Anthem For Doomed Youth Records)
- Master of Profits CD / 7" (2002, Forge Again Records)
- Split-CD with Don't Worry About It (2003, Walk In Cold Records)
- Split 7" with Fordirelifesake 7" (2002, Forge Again)
- Split-CD with Fork Knife Spoon 7" (2004, Calls And Correspondence)
- The Smell Of Money CD (2005, Eugenics)
- Microeconomics CD (2006, Bloom Explode / Level Plane Records)
- Microeconomics 7" (2008, Gilead Media)
- Split-CD with Graf Orlock 7" (2009, Level Plane Records)
- Split 7" with Chica X (2009, Cassette Deck)
- "Machine Death" Cassette Tape Release - as Optimus Prime, included on The Discographer CD.
