= Moped Army =

North American organization based on mopeds

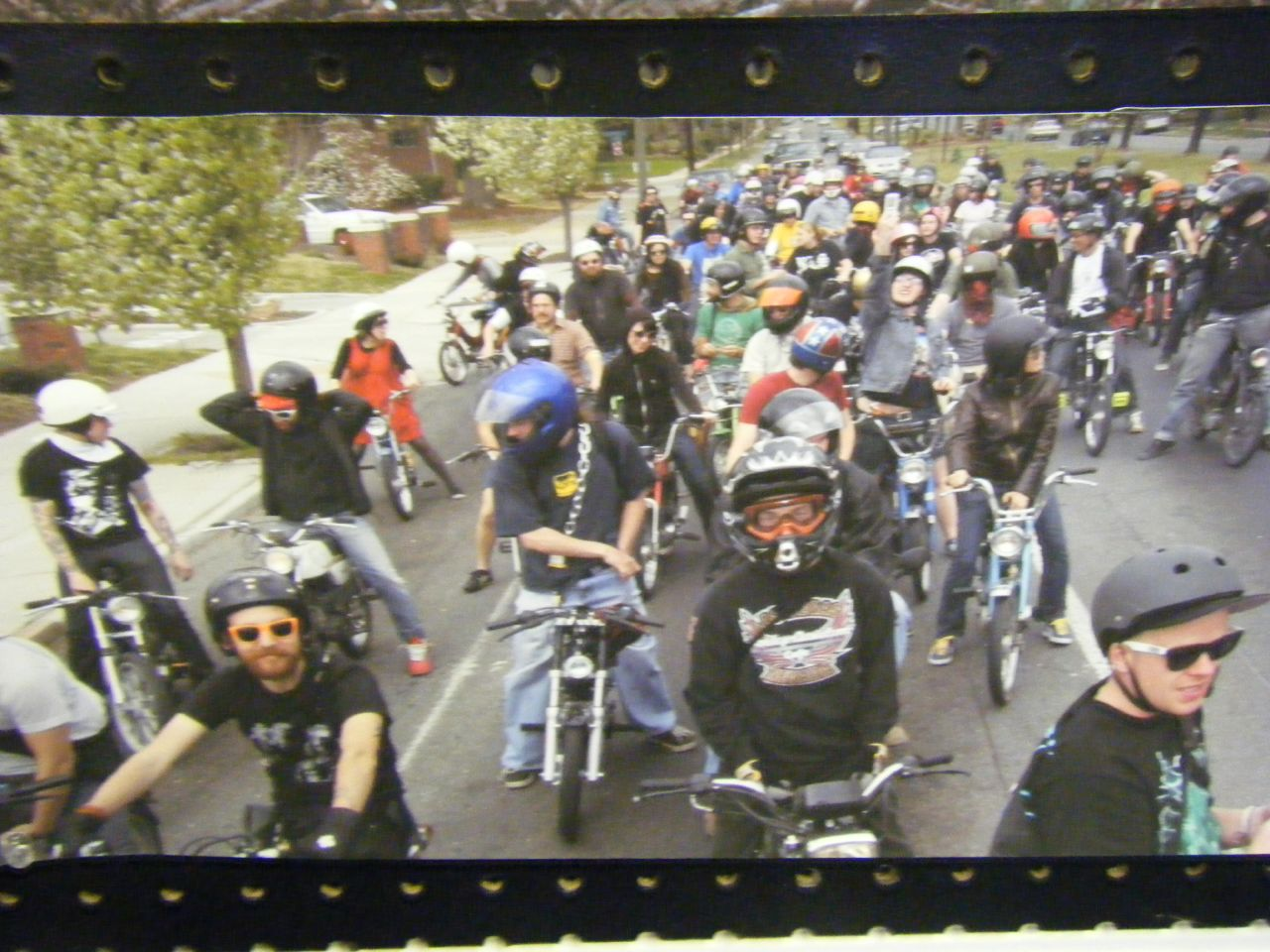
- A 2008 rally organized by Moped Army
- Formation: 1997
- Locations: United States; Canada
- Region served: United States; Canada
- Members: 965 (active); 307 (emeritus)
- Official language: English; Spanish; French
- Leader: Daniel "Weber" Kastner; Simon King; Brennan Sang
- Website: www.mopedarmy.com

The Moped Army is an organization of moped enthusiasts centered on the organization's website, which serves as a catalyst for the spread of moped culture and the organization of moped-related events throughout the US and Canada.

== About ==
Founded in 1997 as the "Decepticons" in Kalamazoo, Michigan, by Daniel "Weber" Kastner, Simon King, and Brennan Sang. The founders and other millennials were attracted to mopeds due to their uniqueness and for being socially responsible. The Moped Army was planned as a network to strengthen the community.

Members ride 1970s 2 stroke mopeds that go 25-30 MPH, though a lot of people modify theirs to go faster. Due to the mopeds age and speed, they are inexpensive to purchase and maintain with more experienced members teaching newer ones. Members join for solidarity and support and are typically students or recent graduates with men making up roughly two-thirds of all members. In larger cities such as San Francisco, riders appreciate the ease of parking.

=== Branches ===
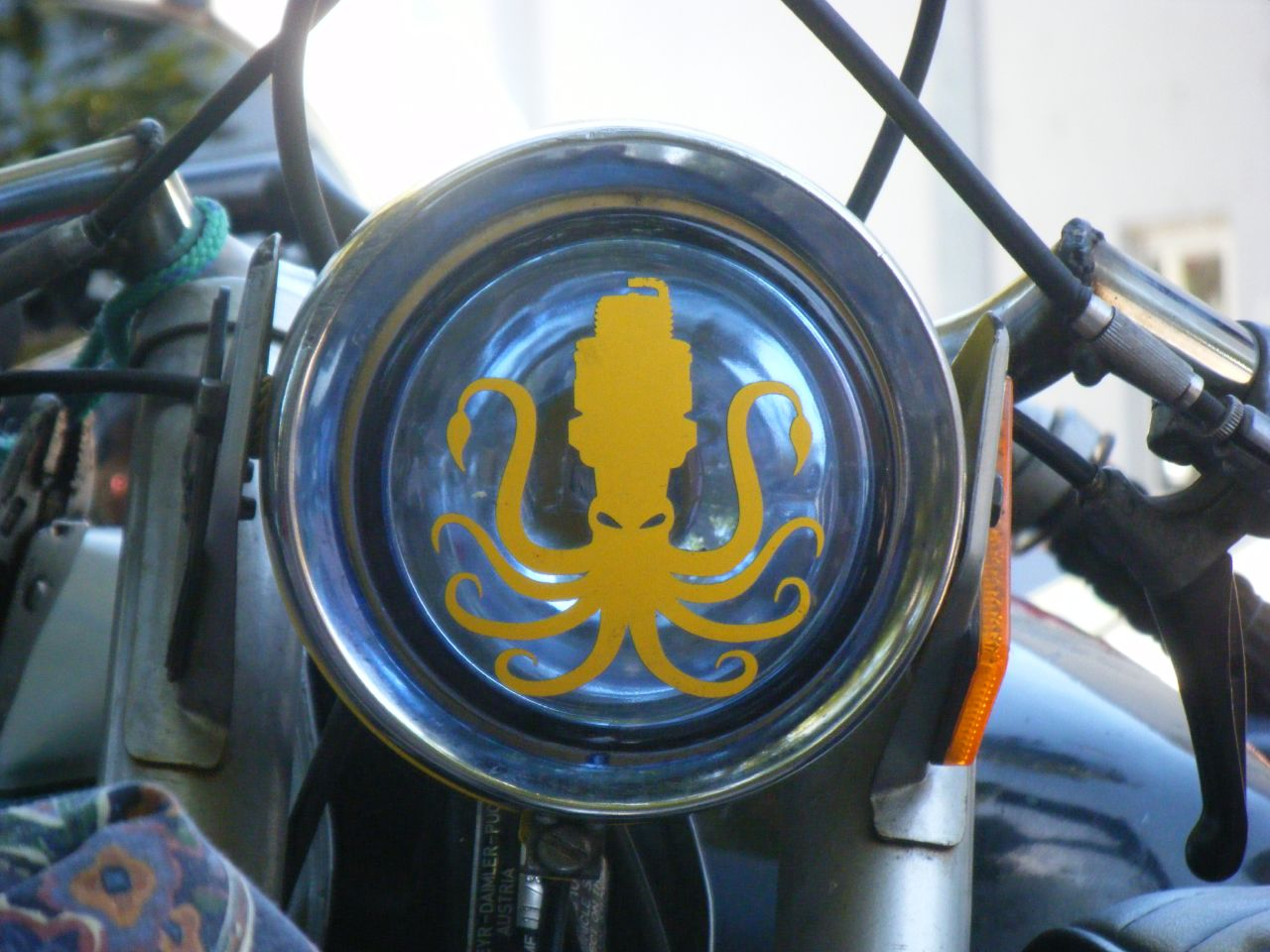
Landsquids branch emblem

The branches each have a unique name, often inspired by the city in which they are based, and are self-governing; implementing their own criteria regarding membership and activities. With the motto "Swarm and Destroy." Branches host local rides at a regular cadence and an annual multi-day rally where they invite riders from the national branches to ride in their city.

As of 2023, there are 28 active branches and 7 emeritus branches of the Moped Army. The emeritus distinction is granted to branches that have been with the Moped Army for over a decade and requested retirement.

== In popular culture ==
=== Swarm and Destroy (2002) ===
Title card of the 2002 documentary, Swarm and Destroy

In 2002, at an event held in Kalamazoo, Michigan, by the Decepticons’ branch of the Moped Army, a documentary titled Swarm and Destroy was filmed. The documentary chronicles the event in Kalamazoo as well as moped culture as a whole. The individuals documented for the production of the film recounted tales of bizarre happenings while riding their mopeds, and shared what inspired them to come together in camaraderie.

=== Moped Army graphic novel (2005) ===
The Moped Army has been the subject of a graphic novel by Paul Sizer. Founders of the organization provided technical information of mopeds to support the storyline.

=== Rise Against music video (2008) ===
Members of the "emeritus" Chicago branch of Moped Army, Peddy Cash, were featured in the music video for the song "Re-Education (Through Labor)" by the American rock band Rise Against, which was released in September 2008. In the video, they are seen riding their mopeds through a city and planting bombs.
