= Tim McIlrath =

American rock musician (born 1978)

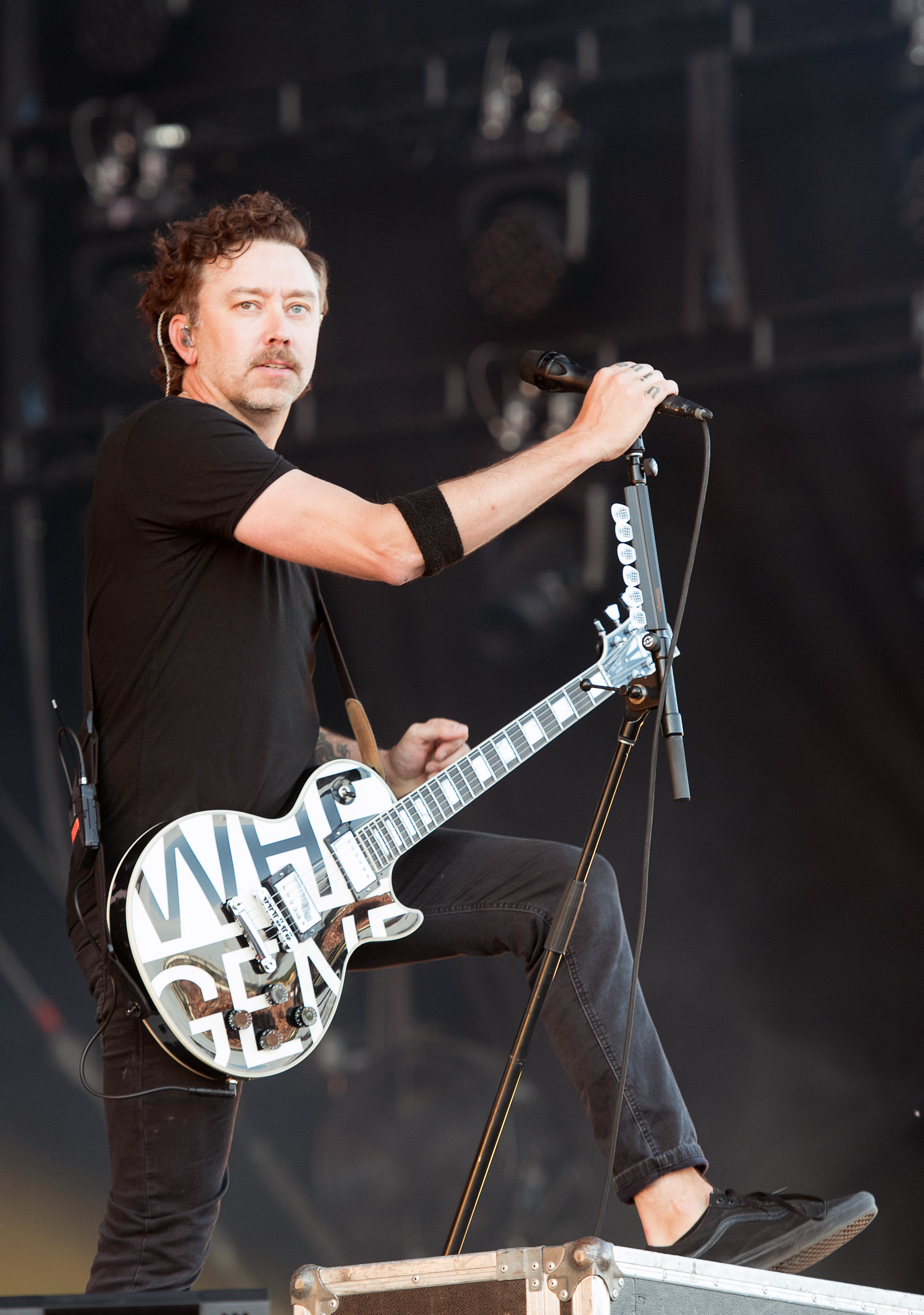
- McIlrath performing in 2023

Background information
- Also known as: James Kaspar
- Born: Timothy James McIlrath; November 3, 1978 (age 47); Indianapolis, Indiana, U.S.
- Origin: Chicago, Illinois, U.S.
- Genres: Melodic hardcore; punk rock; hardcore punk; metalcore; post-hardcore
- Occupations: Musician; singer; songwriter
- Instruments: Vocals; guitar; bass
- Years active: 1995–present
- Member of: Rise Against
- Formerly of: Baxter; Arma Angelus; The Killing Tree; The Honor System; Yellow Road Priest

Timothy James McIlrath (born November 3, 1978) is an American rock musician. He is the lead singer, rhythm guitarist, songwriter and co-founder of the punk rock band Rise Against. He is vegetarian and straight edge.

== Early and personal life ==
McIlrath was born in 1978 to Jim and Michelle McIlrath. He attended Rolling Meadows High School in Rolling Meadows, Illinois. In college (Northeastern Illinois University), McIlrath majored in English and Sociology. In his junior year, he met Joe Principe at a Sick of It All concert. Principe asked McIlrath to sing over a few tracks that he and Dan Wleklinski had recorded. It was at this time that Transistor Revolt was formed. McIlrath left college after Transistor Revolt was signed onto Fat Wreck Chords in 1999. In the fall of 2020, McIlrath returned to college to finish his Sociology degree.

He and his wife, Erin, have two daughters. His youngest daughter, Scarlet, was named Miss Illinois Teen USA in 2026. McIlrath appeared in the 2011 HBO documentary The Other F Word, featuring punk rockers who became fathers, which included a scene of McIlrath trying to convince his elder daughter, Blythe, to sing along with the Rise Against song "Ready To Fall" on camera.

McIlrath has a condition called heterochromia, where his left eye is blue and his right eye is hazel.

== Music career ==
=== Baxter (1995–1999) ===
McIlrath began his musical career in his teens and was active in the Chicago local punk rock scene. His first band was the post-hardcore band Baxter, formed in 1995 along with future Lawrence Arms drummer Neil Hennessy and future Killing Tree and Holy Roman Empire bassist Geoff Reu. Their first release was a full-length, self-released cassette, Troy's Bucket, which was released in 1996. Troy's Bucket was met with a warm reception from the scene, and Baxter became a popular band in the Chicago underground scene.

In 1997, they released a 7-inch EP, Lost Voices, on Static Station Records. After some local touring, the band split up.

McIlrath played bass and sang backup in the first incarnation of the Honor System. He sang one song on their demo. He and drummer Neil Hennesy were also in a brief lineup of the grindcore band Yellow Road Priest, whose members went on to form Pelican. The band broke up in 1999.

=== Arma Angelus (1998–1999) ===
McIlrath joined the band Arma Angelus, a Chicago metalcore band fronted by Pete Wentz, who would later be bassist in the pop punk band Fall Out Boy. McIlrath played bass in the band until 1999 when he quit to form Transistor Revolt, which became Rise Against, and the Killing Tree.

=== Rise Against (1999–present) ===
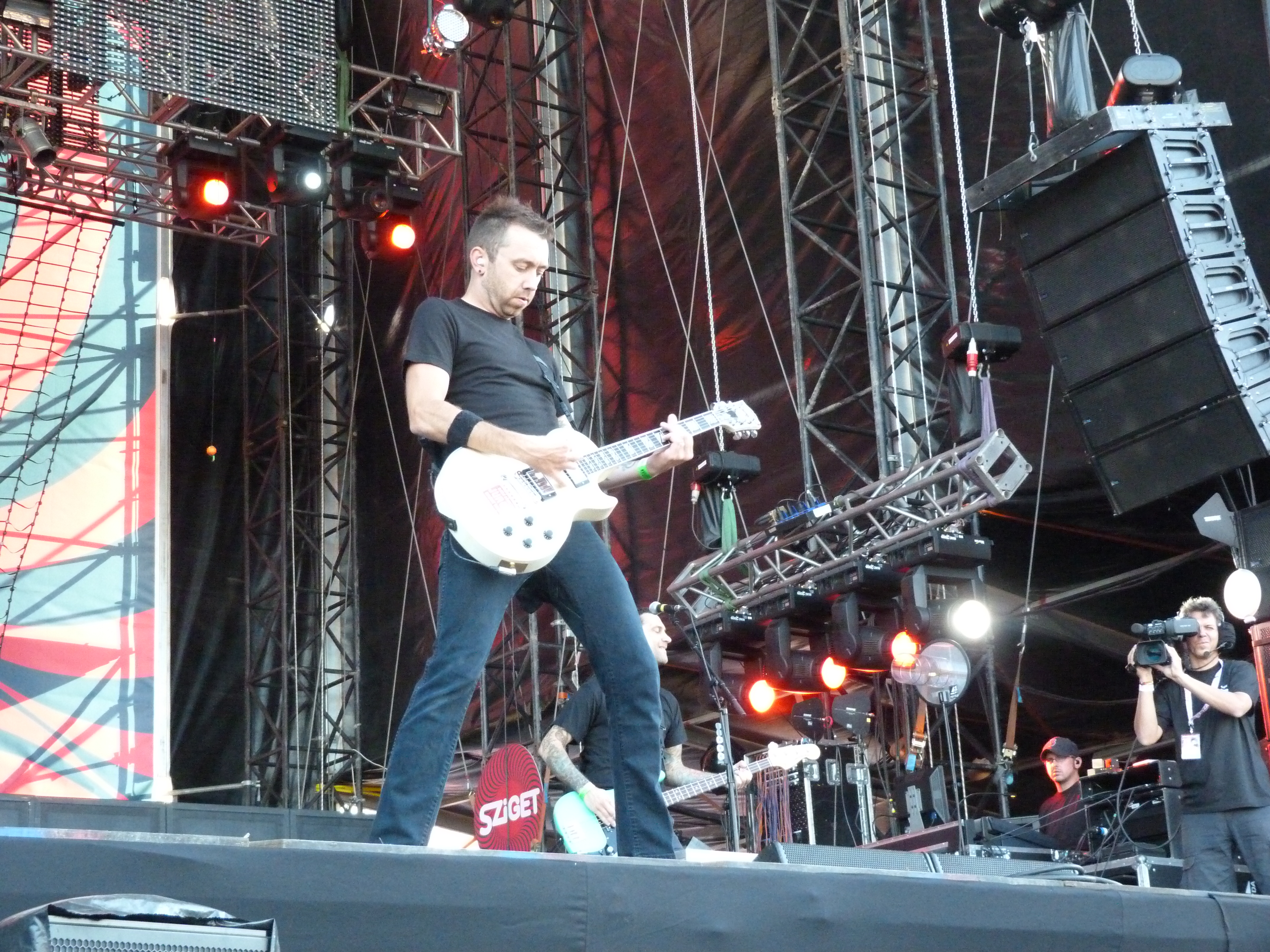
McIlrath playing at Sziget Festival in Budapest in 2011

In 1999, Tim McIlrath formed the band that would become Rise Against with former 88 Fingers Louie bassist, Joe Principe, guitarist Dan Precision (A.K.A. Mr. Precision), and drummer Toni Tintari under the name Transistor Revolt. Drummer Brandon Barnes did not join until 2001; it was at the same time the band was renamed Rise Against. They officially recorded their debut album, The Unraveling, on Fat Wreck Chords in 2001.

In 2002 guitarist Mr. Precision left due to arguments with the band, and Todd Mohney filled his role. Later that year they released their second album, Revolutions per Minute, which was greeted with warm success. They toured the U.S. steadily that year, though by the end of it, Mohney left. In order to replace him, former Reach the Sky guitarist Chris Chasse joined in 2004 and they released their Geffen debut Siren Song of the Counter Culture.

With the release of the singles "Give It All", "Swing Life Away", and "Life Less Frightening", Rise Against became more popular with mainstream fans, but still kept their underground sensibility. After more touring (including a European tour and spots on the Vans Warped tour), the band went back to the studio and recorded their fourth album, The Sufferer & the Witness, which included four singles ("Ready to Fall", "Prayer of the Refugee", "The Good Left Undone", and "Behind Closed Doors").

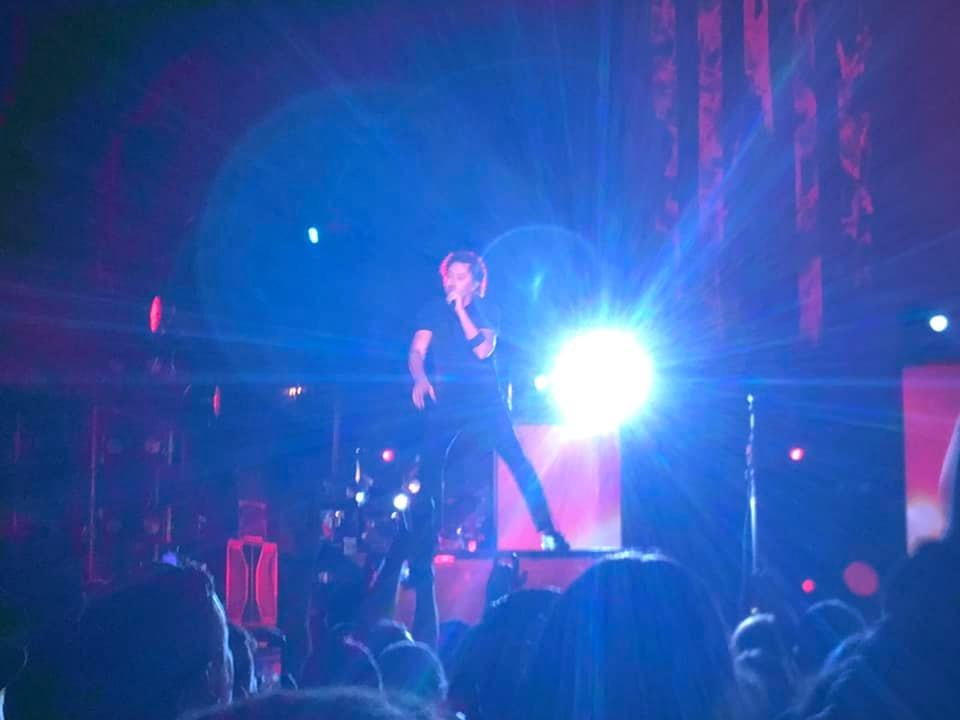
McIlrath performing in Philadelphia in 2021

As of 2025, McIlrath has recorded ten studio albums with Rise Against (The Unraveling, Revolutions per Minute, Siren Song of the Counter Culture, The Sufferer & the Witness, Appeal to Reason, Endgame, The Black Market, Wolves, Nowhere Generation and Ricochet), as well as a compilation album (The Ghost Note Symphonies, Vol. 1) and EP (Nowhere Generation II), and has remained as the main lyricist of the band.

=== The Killing Tree (1999–2006) ===
McIlrath has played in his metalcore side project the Killing Tree along with former Rise Against guitarist Todd Mohney and former Baxter and Holy Roman Empire bassist, Geoff Reu. During the early years of the band, all members used pseudonyms (Tim's being James Kaspar) out of concern for it. The Killing Tree has not produced any music or toured since 2004, but contributed their previously unreleased song "Dressed to Fuck" to the 2006 Thick Records compilation album Hair: Chicago Punk Cuts, which featured Emily Schambra (of Holy Roman Empire) on guest vocals on the song. Schambra also contributed backing vocals on Rise Against's album The Sufferer & the Witness for the songs "The Approaching Curve", "Roadside", and the b-side "But Tonight We Dance".

== Activism ==
When the band first began, McIlrath stated how they were not seeking to gather such a large audience in their pursuit for originality, and this defined them as the "black sheep" of punk rock. The original goal of the band was only to create music, never seen as a long-term group until the band came to a realization of similar activist beliefs that led McIlrath to describe music as a vessel for change. These beliefs started to get integrated into the music most prominently after the release of The Sufferer & The Witness, when McIlrath said that he sought to make a difference in the world he lives in as opposed to being one of the bands in the punk/hardcore scene today that are[n't] saying anything important".

=== Political lyrics ===
Having not grown up in a political family, McIlrath says that he was never particularly involved until he began playing punk rock. After entering the music scene, though, he began to feel a strong connection towards his convictions, specifically animal and human rights. While not all of Rise Against's material is political, songs such as "Swing Life Away" and "Make It Stop" have risen to prominence as McIlrath seeks to speak to a generation that he believes is lacking conviction towards their world, as explained throughout the storytelling narrative of the band's albums. The band has begun to seek after more politically and socially challenging lyrics as time progresses, responding to current events such as the song "Help Is On The Way" and its use of support for victims of Hurricane Katrina.

=== PETA ===
McIlrath became a vegetarian at the age of eighteen as a result of his own understanding of the meat-industry as opposed to having it "shoved [...] down my throat". The realization of PETA, an animal rights support group, came through the music scene and McIlrath's own realization of the events that occur within meat-processing and inhumane conditions that animals are forced to live in. As time went on, these beliefs got integrated into his lyric writing such as Rise Against video for the single "Ready to Fall" contains footage of factory farming, rodeos, and sport hunting, as well as deforestation, melting ice-caps, and forest fires. The group has called the video the most important video they have ever made. In February 2012 the band released a cover of the Bob Dylan song "Ballad of Hollis Brown" as part of a benefit for Amnesty International. After the release of the film Blackfish, McIlrath worked with PETA to create a video in support of releasing animals in captivity, exclaiming how "I make a choice every time I go out on stage, I choose to perform. Animals in captivity don't get to make that choice".

=== Straight edge ideals ===
McIlrath, along with most of the rest of Rise Against, follows the subculture ideology of "straight edge", a belief that promotes refraining from using alcohol, tobacco and other recreational drugs, in a reaction to the excesses of punk subculture.

== Discography ==
With Rise Against

- Transistor Revolt (2000)
- The Unraveling (2001)
- Revolutions per Minute (2003)
- Siren Song of the Counter Culture (2004)
- The Sufferer & the Witness (2006)
- This Is Noise (2007)
- Appeal to Reason (2008)
- Endgame (2011)
- The Black Market (2014)
- Wolves (2017)
- The Ghost Note Symphonies, Vol. 1 (2018)
- Nowhere Generation (2021)
- Nowhere Generation II (2022)
- Ricochet (2025)

With The Killing Tree

- Bury Me at Make-Out Creek (2000)
- The Romance of Helen Trent (2002)
- We Sing Sin (2003)
- Hair: Chicago Punk Cuts (compilation, "Dressed to Fuck" only) (2006)

With Baxter

- Troy's Bucket full-length cassette (1996)
- Lost Voices... 7-inch (Static Station Recordings, 1997)
- Eastman & Evergreen (1999)
- Baxter two-disc CD compilation (Will Not Clear Man, 2003)

With Arma Angelus

- The Grave End of the Shovel (2001)
- Things We Don't Like We Destroy (compilation) (2002)

With The Honor System

- Single File (four song cassette demo only).

With Flobots

- Survival Story ("White Flag Warrior") (2010).

With Awolnation

- My Echo, My Shadow, My Covers, and Me ("Beds Are Burning") (2022).

With Alkaline Trio

- My Shame Is True ("I, Pessimist") (2013)

With Cancer Bats

- Hail Destroyer ("Harem of Scorpions") (2008)

With Anti-Flag

- Lies They Tell Our Children ("The Fight of Our Lives") (2023)
