= Holy Roman Empire (band) =

American rock band (2003–2008)

- Origin: Chicago, Illinois, United States
- Genres: Post-hardcore; alternative rock; indie rock
- Years active: 2003–2008
- Label: Hewhocorrupts, Inc.
- Past members: Jay Jancetic; Neeraj Kane; Geoff Reu; Tony Tintari; Emily Schambra

Holy Roman Empire was an American rock band formed in Chicago in late 2003. It was founded by musicians from the late-1990's hardcore scene: guitarists Neeraj Kane and Jay Jancetic, and bassist Geoff Reu, with drummer Tony Tintari of Shai Hulud joining the group a few months later. Classically trained singer Emily Schambra joined about a year later, which was followed by the recording of a demo and them beginning to play live shows.

They released their first EP Lost in Landscapes in 2005. Punknews.org's Aubin Paul described it as "pleasant and unassuming but relatively forgettable". AllMusic reviewer Stewart Mason shared this sentiment, calling it "competently executed post-hardcore" and "strictly for serious fans interested in Holy Roman Empire's growing pains". It was followed by their debut album The Longue Durée in 2007, produced by Matt Allison. AllMusic praised the vocals and the production, and said that it is "tuneful without being blatantly commercial, thoughtful without being ickily emo, and a generally rocking good listen". Brian Shultz of Punknews.org stated "it's as solid a debut full-length can usually be produced; its style is a pleasant surprise considering its members' preceding projects; and it could be a great breakout release for Hewhocorrupts, Inc". Alternative Press magazine rated it 4/5. The band broke up in 2008.

== Discography ==
- Lost in Landscapes (EP, 2005)
- The Longue Durée (album, 2007)

== Videography ==
Year	Song	Director
2005	"Guards Off"	Eric Marsh

== Members ==
- Jay Jancetic – guitar (2003–2008)
- Neeraj Kane – guitar (2003–2008)
- Geoff Reu – bass (2003–2008)
- Tony Tintari – drums, percussion (2003–2008)
- Emily Schambra – vocals (2004–2008)
